This is a list of foreign players in the USL Championship (formally USL Pro or the United Soccer League), which commenced play in 2011. The following players must meet both of the following two criteria:
Have played at least one USL regular season game. Players who were signed by USL clubs, but only played in playoff games, U.S. Open Cup games, or did not play in any competitive games at all, are not included.
Are considered foreign, i.e., outside Canada or the United States determined by the following:
A player is considered foreign if he is not eligible to play for the national team of Canada or the United States.
More specifically,
If a player has been capped on international level, the national team is used; if he has been capped by more than one country, the highest level (or the most recent) team is used. These include American and Canadian players with dual citizenship.
If a player has not been capped on international level, his country of birth is used, except those who were born abroad from American or Canadian parents, or moved to Canada or the United States at a young age, and those who clearly indicated to have switched his nationality to another nation.

In bold: players who have played at least one USL game in the current season (2021 USL Championship season), and are still at the clubs for which they have played. This does not include current players of a USL club who have not played a USL game in the current season.

UEFA

Albania
Albi Skendi – Orange County SC – 2022–
Afrim Taku – Tampa Bay Rowdies, Charlotte Independence – 2018–19
Vangjel Zguro – FC Tulsa – 2020

Andorra
Joan Cervós – Colorado Springs Switchbacks – 2020

Armenia
Artur Aghasyan – Los Angeles Blues – 2011
Darón Iskenderian – Las Vegas Lights – 2022–
Gevorg Karapetyan – Orange County Blues – 2016
Michael Soboff – Wilmington Hammerheads – 2016

Austria
Mettin Copier – Dayton Dutch Lions – 2011–12
Daniel Fischer – Saint Louis FC – 2020
Christian Fuchs – Charlotte Independence – 2021
Bernhard Luxbacher – North Carolina FC – 2018
Remi Prieur – Sporting Kansas City II – 2020

Azerbaijan
Rufat Dadashov – Phoenix Rising – 2020–21

Belgium
Jonathan Benteke – Loudoun United – 2022–
Nico Corti – Rio Grande Valley FC Toros – 2018–19
Dylan Damraoui – Portland Timbers 2 – 2016–17
Roland Lamah – Memphis 901 – 2021–
Roy Meeus – Orange County Blues – 2016–17
Mickael Oliveira – Wilmington Hammerheads – 2013–14

Bosnia and Herzegovina
Emir Alihodžić – Seattle Sounders FC 2, Saint Louis FC, Fresno FC – 2016–17, 2019
Dženan Ćatić – Harrisburg City Islanders, RGV FC Toros – 2015–16
Robert Kristo – North Carolina FC – 2019–20
Nedeljko Malić – Indy Eleven – 2021
Ismar Tandir – Sacramento Republic – 2014

Bulgaria
Villyan Bijev – Portland Timbers 2, Sacramento Republic FC, Oklahoma City Energy – 2016–21
Georgi Hristov – Tampa Bay Rowdies – 2017–18

Croatia
Petar Čuić – Sporting Kansas City II, FC Tulsa – 2020–
Matej Deković – Tulsa Roughnecks – 2017
Aljaž Džankić – Sporting Kansas City II – 2021
Romeo Filipović – Orange County Blues, Arizona United – 2015
Edi Horvat – Birmingham Legion – 2022
Nikola Katic – Pittsburgh Riverhounds – 2011–13
Roberto Punčec – Sporting Kansas City II – 2021
Dominik Rešetar – Sporting Kansas City II – 2020–21

Cyprus
Tom Williams – Arizona United – 2016

Denmark
Patrick Bunk-Andersen – Pittsburgh Riverhounds – 2020
Michael Byskov – Oklahoma City Energy – 2015–16
Sebastian Dalgaard – Oklahoma City Energy, Saint Louis FC, Hartford Athletic, Tampa Bay Rowdies – 2015–17, 2019–
Adda Djeziri – Oklahoma City Energy – 2014
Frederik Due – Hartford Athletic, Orange County SC – 2019–20
Thomas Enevoldsen – Orange County SC, Indy Eleven, Sacramento Republic – 2018–21
Niko Hansen – San Antonio FC – 2023–
Mads Jørgensen – Hartford Athletic – 2019–20
Mathias Jørgensen – New York Red Bulls II – 2019, 2021
Thomas Juel-Nielsen – Orange County SC – 2018
Danni König – Oklahoma City Energy, FC Cincinnati – 2015–18
Philip Lund – Oklahoma City Energy – 2014
Nikolaj Lyngø – Hartford Athletic – 2019
Emil Nielsen – Orange County SC – 2023–
Patrick Nielsen – Atlanta United 2 – 2020
Daniel Pedersen – Orange County SC – 2022–
Magnus Rasmussen – Louisville City – 2015–16, 2018–19
Philip Rasmussen – Oklahoma City Energy, Hartford Athletic – 2017—19
Rasmus Thellufsen – Louisville City – 2023–
Martin Vingaard – Tampa Bay Rowdies – 2017–18

England
Noah Abrams – Loudoun United – 2021
Charlie Adams – Louisville City, Real Monarchs, Orange County SC, San Diego Loyal – 2015–
Mo Adams – Tulsa Roughnecks, Atlanta United 2 – 2018–19
Matthew Aldred – Antigua Barracuda – 2012
Ben Algar – FC New York – 2011
Chris Allan – Atlanta United 2, Memphis 901, Charleston Battery – 2021–
Tomi Ameobi – FC Cincinnati – 2018
Sadik Balarabe – Birmingham Legion – 2022
Jonathan Barden – Ottawa Fury, Saint Louis FC – 2017–18
Jack Barmby – Portland Timbers 2, San Antonio FC, Phoenix Rising – 2016–20
Matthew Barnes-Homer – Wilmington Hammerheads – 2016
Casey Bartlett-Scott – Pittsburgh Riverhounds – 2021
James Baxendale – Orange County SC – 2017
Jose Baxter – Memphis 901 – 2020
Laurie Bell – Tulsa Roughnecks – 2015
Adam Black – Tulsa Roughnecks – 2015
Tyler Blackwood – Arizona United, Sacramento Republic, Swope Park Rangers, Saint Louis FC, Oakland Roots – 2016–21
Luke Boden – Orlando City, Orlando City B, Tampa Bay Rowdies – 2011–14, 2016–17
Conor Branson – Pittsburgh Riverhounds – 2016
Tom Brewitt – Tacoma Defiance, Hartford Athletic – 2021–
Mark Briggs – Wilmington Hammerheads – 2012–13
Harry Brockbank – El Paso Locomotive – 2022
Alex Bruce – San Antonio FC – 2018
Daniel Bruce – New Mexico United – 2019–
Richard Bryan – Saint Louis – 2020
Ricky Burke – Richmond Kickers – 2015
Antonee Burke-Gilroy – Tacoma Defiance – 2018–20
Jake Cawsey – Colorado Springs Switchbacks – 2016–17
Richard Chaplow – Orange County SC – 2016–18
Callum Chapman-Page – FC Tulsa, Miami FC – 2020–
Paul Clowes – Richmond Kickers, Charlotte Independence, Orlando City B – 2016–17
Carlton Cole – Sacramento Republic – 2016
Joe Cole – Tampa Bay Rowdies – 2017–18
Joe Connor – Charlotte Eagles – 2011
Deri Corfe – New York Red Bulls II – 2020
Paco Craig – Louisville City, Miami FC – 2016–19, 2021–
Sam Craven – FC New York – 2011
Michael Cunningham – FC Tulsa – 2021
Mitchell Curry – Hartford Athletic – 2022–
Alex Davey – Hartford Athletic, Tampa Bay Rowdies – 2019–20
Danny Deakin – Orlando City B – 2017
Matthew Delicâte – Richmond Kickers – 2011–16
Charlie Dennis – Oakland Roots, Tampa Bay Rowdies – 2022–
Liam Doyle – Harrisburg City Islanders, Swope Park Rangers, Nashville SC, Memphis 901, San Antonio FC, Indy Eleven, LA Galaxy II – 2016–22
Otis Earle – Arizona United – 2015
Mandela Egbo – New York Red Bulls II – 2020–21
Johnny Fenwick – San Antonio FC, Las Vegas Lights, FC Tulsa – 2019–22
Jermaine Fordah – El Paso Locomotive, Loudoun United – 2019, 2021
Mark Forrest – Pittsburgh Riverhounds – 2019–20
Harry Forrester – Orange County SC – 2019–20
Andrew Fox – El Paso Locomotive, Orange County SC – 2019–
Ricky Gabriel – Antigua Barracuda – 2012
Jordan Gibbons – Phoenix Rising – 2017
Sam Gleadle – Reno 1868, San Antonio FC, Monterey Bay FC – 2019–
Elliot Green – Whitecaps FC 2 – 2016
Jack Gurr – Atlanta United 2, Sacramento Republic – 2020–
Harri Hawkins – Penn FC, Loudoun United – 2018–19
William Heaney – Wilmington Hammerheads – 2013–15
Harrison Heath – Orlando City, Orlando City B, Sacramento Republic, Miami FC – 2014, 2016–17, 2020
Colin Heffron – New York Red Bulls II – 2015
Lewis Hilton – Charlotte Independence, Saint Louis FC, Tampa Bay Rowdies – 2016–
Seb Hines – Orlando City B – 2017
Joe Holland – Rio Grande Valley FC Toros, Pittsburgh Riverhounds, Birmingham Legion – 2017–19
Luke Holmes – Wilmington Hammerheads – 2012
Mark Howard – Oklahoma City Energy – 2014
Tyreke Johnson – Hartford Athletic – 2020
Aaron Jones – Bethlehem Steel – 2017
Matt Jones – Bethlehem Steel – 2016
Ryan Jones – Richmond Kickers – 2011, 2013
Macauley King – Indy Eleven, El Paso Locomotive, Colorado Springs Switchbacks – 2019–
Wilson Kneeshaw – Sacramento Republic – 2016–18
Cameron Lancaster – Louisville City, Nashville SC – 2015–
Nicky Law – Indy Eleven, Tampa Bay Rowdies – 2021–22
Luke Magill – Dayton Dutch Lions – 2011–12
Moses Makinde – Tulsa Roughnecks, El Paso Locomotive – 2019–20
Jamie McGuinness – VSI Tampa Bay, Colorado Springs Switchbacks – 2013, 2015
Tom Mellor – Harrisburg City Islanders – 2012–13
Aiden Mesias – Hartford Athletic – 2019–20
Jack Metcalf – Charlotte Independence, Atlanta United 2, San Diego Loyal – 2015–16, 2018–22
Tamika Mkandawire – Tampa Bay Rowdies – 2017–18
James Moore – Charlotte Eagles – 2013
Taylor Morgan – Tulsa Roughnecks, San Antonio FC – 2016
Luke Mulholland – Wilmington Hammerheads, Real Monarchs – 2011, 2016–20
Lewis Neal – Orlando City, Orlando City B – 2011, 2016–17
Paul Nicholson – Wilmington Hammerheads, FC Cincinnati – 2011–17
Onua Obasi – Rochester Rhinos, Ottawa Fury – 2014–15, 2017–19
Kal Okot – Oklahoma City Energy – 2019
Arron Patrick – Wilmington Hammerheads – 2013
Dion Pereira – Atlanta United 2 – 2019
Nick Radosavljevic – Saint Louis FC – 2017
Peter Ramage – Phoenix Rising – 2016–17
Louis Ramsay – Rio Grande Valley FC Toros – 2021
Danny Reynolds – Tacoma Defiance – 2020
Caleb Richards – Tampa Bay Rowdies – 2019
Jordan Rideout – Arizona United, Oklahoma City Energy – 2015–16
Jamil Roberts – Sporting Kansas City II – 2021
Jordan Roberts – Saint Louis FC, Reno 1868 – 2015–17
Finbarr Robins – Antigua Barracuda – 2012
Arthur Rogers – Hartford Athletic – 2020–21
John Rooney – Orlando City – 2012
Luke Rooney – Phoenix Rising – 2016–18
Callum Ross – Charlotte Independence, Oklahoma City Energy – 2017–19
Darrelle Russell – Antigua Barracuda – 2012
Anthony Sanderson – Antigua Barracuda – 2012
David Schofield – Harrisburg City Islanders – 2011
Oliver Shannon – Atlanta United 2 – 2018
Jamie Scope – Wilmington Hammerheads – 2011
Paul Shaw – FC New York – 2011
Tola Showunmi – Pittsburgh Riverhounds – 2023–
Kimarni Smith – Loudoun United, San Antonio FC – 2021–
Emmanuel Sonupe – El Paso Locomotive – 2022–
Chris Spendlove – Wilmington Hammerheads – 2011
Connor Stanley – Atlanta United 2 – 2021
Jordan Stewart – Phoenix Rising – 2017
Sam Stockley – FC New York – 2011
Joe Tait – Dayton Dutch Lions – 2011
Tom Taylor – Wilmington Hammerheads – 2011
Steven Taylor – Portland Timbers 2 – 2016
Curtis Thorn – Miami FC – 2023–
Alex Touche – New Mexico United – 2021
Daniel Trickett-Smith – Sacramento Republic – 2016–17
Liam Trotter – Orange County SC – 2019
Shaun Utterson – Wilmington Hammerheads – 2013
Rob Vincent – Pittsburgh Riverhounds – 2013–16
Charlie Ward – RVG FC Toros, San Antonio FC, Ottawa Fury, Oklahoma City Energy – 2016–21
Matt Watson – Phoenix Rising, Indy Eleven – 2017–20
Harry Williams – Sacramento Republic – 2016–17
Ryan Williams – Ottawa Fury, Hartford Athletic – 2017, 2019
Henry Wise – New York Red Bulls II – 2022–
Ollie Wright – San Antonio FC, Rio Grande Valley FC Toros – 2021–
Shaun Wright-Phillips – New York Red Bulls II, Phoenix Rising – 2016–17
Finnlay Wyatt – Richmond Kickers – 2017–18
Paul Wyatt – Oklahoma City Energy – 2014
Laurence Wyke – Atlanta United 2, Tampa Bay Rowdies – 2019, 2021–22
Dru Yearwood – New York Red Bulls II – 2021

Estonia
Erik Sorga – Loudoun United – 2021

Finland
Mikko Kuningas – Orange County SC – 2021–22
Eero Markkanen – Orange County SC – 2021
Petteri Pennanen – Sacramento Republic – 2021
Verneri Välimaa – Orange County Blues, Colorado Springs Switchbacks – 2016, 2018

France
Joris Ahlinvi – New Mexico United – 2020
André Auras – LA Galaxy II – 2014–15
Vincent Bezecourt – New York Red Bulls II, Miami FC – 2016–20
Jason Bli – LA Galaxy II – 2014–15
Alexy Bosetti – Oklahoma City Energy, El Paso Locomotive – 2019–20
Rayane Boukemia – Rochester Rhinos – 2017
Rémi Cabral – LA Galaxy II – 2021–
Hassoun Camara – FC Montreal – 2015
Nicolas Caraux – Atlanta United 2 – 2018
Abdoulaye Cissoko – Tacoma Defiance – 2019–21
Killian Colombie – Swope Park Rangers – 2019
Laurent Courtois – LA Galaxy II – 2014
Thomas de Villardi – Austin Bold, Charlotte Independence – 2019–21
Mathieu Deplagne – San Antonio FC – 2021
Bradley Diallo – LA Galaxy II – 2014–17
Issiar Dramé – New York Red Bulls II – 2021
Félicien Dumas – Indy Eleven – 2020
Yann Ekra – Harrisburg City Islanders, Charlotte Independence, Tampa Bay Rowdies – 2012–
Hugo Fauroux – Austin Bold, Charleston Battery, Loudoun United – 2021–
Fabien Garcia – Austin Bold, San Antonio FC – 2019–
Antoine Hoppenot – Harrisburg City Islanders, FC Cincinnati, Reno 1868, Tampa Bay Rowdies, Louisville City, Detroit City – 2012, 2014–
Bradley Kamdem – Rochester Rhinos, Fresno FC, Saint Louis FC, Atlanta United 2 – 2016–22
Robin Lapert – Hartford Athletic – 2022–
Yanis Leerman – Loudoun United – 2023–
Simon Lefebvre – Loudoun United – 2020
Gael Mabiala – Birmingham Legion – 2019
Paul Marie – Reno 1868 – 2018
Sylvain Marveaux – Charlotte Independence – 2021
Gabriel Obertan – Charlotte Independence – 2021
Pierre Omanga – Rochester Rhinos – 2014
Romuald Peiser – Penn FC – 2018
Jason Pendant – New York Red Bulls II – 2021–22
Louis Perez – Pittsburgh Riverhounds – 2021
Clément Simonin – Toronto FC II – 2015–16
Nicolas Taravel – Oklahoma City Energy – 2019–20
Sofiane Tergou – Rochester Rhinos – 2016–17
Steven Thicot – Charlotte Independence – 2019
Toni Tiente – Atlanta United 2 – 2022–
Diedie Traore – LA Galaxy II, San Antonio FC – 2018–20, 2022
Florian Valot – New York Red Bulls II, Miami FC – 2016–19, 2021–

Georgia
Irakli Khutsidze – Dayton Dutch Lions – 2013–14

Germany
Philipp Beigl – New Mexico United – 2021
Charalampos Chantzopoulos – Sacramento Republic – 2019
Julian Engels – Rochester Rhinos, LA Galaxy II – 2017–18
Dennis Erdmann – Colorado Springs Switchbacks – 2022–
Wal Fall – Rochester Rhinos, Saint Louis FC, Ottawa Fury, Oakland Roots – 2016–21
Sascha Görres – Richmond Kickers – 2011–16
Christopher Hellmann – Charlotte Independence – 2016
Fabian Herbers – Bethlehem Steel – 2016–18
Marcel Kandziora – North Carolina FC – 2018
Kevin Kratz – Atlanta United 2 – 2018–19
Tim Kübel – Toronto FC II – 2018
Jeffrey Kyei – Pittsburgh Riverhounds – 2015
Jan-Erik Leinhos – Louisville City – 2022
János Löbe – New York Red Bulls II, Miami FC – 2019–21
Ben Lundt – Louisville City, Phoenix Rising – 2019–22
Nico Matern – Indy Eleven – 2018–19
Timo Mehlich – Rio Grande Valley FC Toros – 2020
Kristian Nicht – Rochester Rhinos – 2012–13
Yannik Oettl – Hartford Athletic, Indy Eleven – 2022–
Timo Pitter – Oklahoma City Energy FC – 2016
Maurice Pluntke – Orange County Blues – 2016
Patrick Rakovsky – Orange County SC – 2021–
Julian Ringhof – Rochester Rhinos, Arizona United – 2015–16
Amir Šašivarević – Oklahoma City Energy – 2019
Marcel Schäfer – Tampa Bay Rowdies – 2017–18
Kevin Schindler – FC Cincinnati – 2017
Yomi Scintu – Philadelphia Union II – 2019–20
David Spies – Charlotte Independence – 2017
Leo Stolz – New York Red Bulls II – 2015
Mélé Temguia – FC Montreal, FC Cincinnati – 2015–17
Mattia Trianni – Reno 1868 – 2019
Gordon Wild – Charleston Battery, Atlanta United 2, Loudoun United, Indy Eleven – 2018–19, 2021
Milo Yousef – FC Tulsa – 2023–

Greece
Vassilios Apostolopoulos – Rochester Rhinos – 2015–16
Georgios Kyriazis – Rochester Rhinos – 2012–13
Giannis Nikopolidis – New York Red Bulls II – 2022–
Alexandros Tabakis – Charleston Battery, North Carolina FC, New Mexico United – 2016–
Stavros Zarokostas – Charleston Battery – 2020–21

Hungary
Bence Pávkovics – El Paso Locomotive – 2023–
Dániel Sallói – Swope Park Rangers – 2016–17
Barnabas Tanyi – Detroit City – 2022–
Benedek Tanyi – Detroit City – 2022–
Péter Tóth – Oklahoma City Energy – 2015–16

Iceland
Óttar Magnús Karlsson – Oakland Roots – 2022

Ireland
Paddy Barrett – FC Cincinnati, Indy Eleven – 2018–20
Biko Bradnock-Brennan – San Antonio FC – 2016
Kyle Callan-McFadden – Orlando City B – 2016
Stephen Carroll – Detroit City – 2022–
Dan Casey – Sacramento Republic – 2021–
James Chambers – Bethlehem Steel – 2016–19
Ryan Coulter – Rio Grande Valley FC Toros – 2020
Iarfhlaith Davoren – Tulsa Roughnecks – 2015–16
Lee Desmond – Sacramento Republic – 2022–
Jordan Doherty – Tampa Bay Rowdies – 2019–21, 2023–
Danny Earls – Rochester Rhinos, Pittsburgh Riverhounds – 2012–17
Colin Falvey – Charleston Battery, Ottawa Fury – 2011–14, 2018
Derek Foran – Sacramento Republic – 2015–16
Jon Gallagher – Atlanta United 2 – 2018–19
Rob Kiernan – Orange County SC – 2020–
Niall McCabe – Louisville City – 2015–
Shane McEleney – Ottawa Fury – 2017
Peter McGlynn – Sacramento Republic – 2017
Liam Miller – Wilmington Hammerheads – 2016
Aaron Molloy – Portland Timbers 2, Memphis 901 – 2020, 2022–
Bobby Moseley – San Antonio FC – 2016
Pearse O'Brien – Real Monarchs, Hartford Athletic – 2021–
James O'Connor – Orlando City – 2012–14
Stephen Roche – FC New York – 2011
Richie Ryan – FC Cincinnati, El Paso Locomotive – 2018–22
Timi Sobowale – Real Monarchs – 2021
Corey Whelan – Phoenix Rising – 2019–20

Israel
Guy Abend – Louisville City, Reno 1868, Saint Louis FC – 2015–20
Idan Cohen – Hartford Athletic – 2020
Dekel Keinan – FC Cincinnati, Sacramento Republic, Las Vegas Lights – 2018–

Italy
Luca Antonelli – Miami FC – 2021–22
Antonio Bua – Harrisburg City Islanders – 2013
Daniele Proch – North Carolina FC – 2020
Claudio Repetto – Charleston Battery, Phoenix Rising, Miami FC – 2021–
Paolo Tornaghi – Whitecaps FC 2 – 2015

Montenegro
Emrah Klimenta – Sacramento Republic, LA Galaxy II, Reno 1868, San Diego Loyal, Oakland Roots – 2014–
Luka Malešević – Rio Grande Valley FC Toros – 2022–
Luka Petričević – Orange County Blues – 2015
Nemanja Vuković – Sacramento Republic, Tulsa Roughnecks – 2014–15, 2018

Netherlands
Edson Braafheid – Austin Bold – 2019–20
Sem de Wit – Whitecaps FC 2, FC Cincinnati, Hartford Athletic – 2016–19
Wichert de Wit – Dayton Dutch Lions – 2013
Nixon Dias – Dayton Dutch Lions – 2012
Jos Hooiveld – Orange County SC – 2018
Tim Janssen – Oklahoma City Energy – 2016
Collins John – Pittsburgh Riverhounds – 2014
Remco Klaasse – Dayton Dutch Lions – 2013
Kai Koreniuk – LA Galaxy II – 2019–21
Daniel Krutzen – Phoenix Rising – 2023–
Marios Lomis – North Carolina FC, El Paso Locomotive – 2018–20
Frank Olijve – Orange County SC – 2017
Lucien Seymour – Dayton Dutch Lions – 2011
Marvin van der Pluijm – Dayton Dutch Lions – 2011
Yesin van der Pluijm – Colorado Springs Switchbacks – 2022
Ivar van Dinteren – Dayton Dutch Lions – 2011
Jerry van Wolfgang – Orange County SC, Reno 1868 – 2017–19
Vinnie Vermeer – Nashville SC, Las Vegas Lights – 2019
Glenn Visser – Dayton Dutch Lions – 2013
Tjeerd Westdijk – Dayton Dutch Lions – 2014
Giliano Wijnaldum – Bethlehem Steel – 2017
Julius Wille – Dayton Dutch Lions – 2011

North Macedonia
Dragan Stojkov – LA Galaxy II, Saint Louis FC – 2014, 2017

Northern Ireland
Daniel Finlayson – Orange County SC – 2020
Niall Logue – Memphis 901, Hartford Athletic – 2021–
Martin Maybin – Colorado Springs Switchbacks – 2015–16, 2018
Owen Morrison – FC New York – 2011
Cammy Palmer – Orange County SC – 2020
Martin Paterson – Tampa Bay Rowdies – 2017
Robin Shroot – Nashville SC – 2018
Thomas Stewart – Sacramento Republic – 2014–16
Kyle Vassell – San Diego Loyal – 2022

Norway
Øyvind Alseth – Toronto FC II – 2017
Morten Bjørshol – Las Vegas Lights – 2022–
Ryan Doghman – Orange County SC – 2023–
Jonas Fjeldberg – Rio Grande Valley FC Toros, Indy Eleven – 2021–
Sivert Haugli – Phoenix Rising – 2022
Eirik Johansen – Wilmington Hammerheads – 2015
Skage Lehland – Loudoun United, Detroit City – 2022–
Markus Naglestad – Hartford Athletic – 2020
Markus Nakkim – Orange County SC – 2023–
Mikael Tørset Johnsen – Oakland Roots – 2022
Chris Wingate – Bethlehem Steel – 2017

Poland
Dariusz Formella – Sacramento Republic, Oakland Roots – 2019–
Oskar Gasecki – Saint Louis FC – 2015
Konrad Plewa – New York Red Bulls II, Saint Louis FC, Real Monarchs – 2015–19
Kacper Przybyłko – Bethlehem Steel – 2019
Wojciech Wojcik – Oklahoma City Energy, Hartford Athletic – 2016–17, 2019
Tomasz Zahorski – Charlotte Independence – 2015

Portugal
Edinho Júnior – Harrisburg City Islanders – 2014
Zé Pedro – Sporting Kansas City II – 2019–20
Rafael Ramos – Orlando City, Orlando City B – 2014, 2016–17
Januário Silva – Tulsa Roughnecks – 2019

Russia
Rassambek Akhmatov – Swope Park Rangers – 2018–19
Pavel Kondrakhin – Tulsa Roughnecks – 2017
Valeri Saramutin – Austin Bold – 2019–20

Scotland
Jack Blake – Tampa Bay Rowdies, Real Monarchs, San Diego Loyal, Indy Eleven – 2018–
Gary Cennerazzo – Tulsa Roughnecks – 2016
Neill Collins – Tampa Bay Rowdies – 2017–18
Alex Cooper – Fresno FC – 2018–19
Robbie Crawford – Charleston Battery, Monterey Bay FC – 2020–
Christian Davidson – Wilmington Hammerheads – 2012–14
Richard Foster – Detroit City – 2022–
Greg Hurst – Phoenix Rising – 2022–
Kevin Kerr – Pittsburgh Riverhounds – 2013–19
Ross MacKenzie – Richmond Kickers – 2011–12
Darren Mackie – Phoenix FC – 2013
Calum Mallace – Seattle Sounders 2, Austin Bold – 2017, 2019
Tam McManus – Rochester Rhinos – 2012–13
Adam Moffat – Sacramento Republic – 2017–18 
Scott Morrison – Phoenix FC, Arizona United – 2013–16
Ryan O'Leary – LA/Orange County Blues – 2013–14
Tom Parratt – Wilmington Hammerheads – 2011–16
Nicki Paterson – Charleston Battery – 2011–13
Mark Ridgers – Orlando City B – 2016
Nick Ross – El Paso Locomotive, Sacramento Republic – 2019–
Allan Russell – LA/Orange County Blues – 2012–14
Sam Stanton – Phoenix Rising – 2020
Daniel Steedman – Charlotte Independence, Atlanta United 2 – 2018, 2020
Ricky Waddell – Los Angeles Blues – 2012

Serbia
Denis Ahmetović – Saint Louis FC – 2017
Tomislav Colić – Los Angeles Blues – 2011
Aleksandar Đoković – LA Galaxy II – 2014
Tyler Feeley – Orange County Blues, Saint Louis FC – 2015–17
Ilija Ilić – Louisville City, Indy Eleven, New Mexico United – 2015–22
Ivan Mirković – Sacramento Republic, Orange County Blues, Saint Louis FC, Tulsa Roughnecks – 2014–18
Milan Petošević – Saint Louis FC – 2017
Pavle Popara – Orange County Blues – 2015–16
Dusan Stevanovic – Orange County Blues – 2016–17
Ilija Stolica – FC New York – 2011
Boris Živanović – Pittsburgh Riverhounds – 2015

Slovenia
Jure Matjašič – Sacramento Republic – 2018

Spain
José Aguinaga – New York Red Bulls II, Phoenix Rising, El Paso Locomotive – 2018–21
Pablo Álvarez – Wilmington Hammerheads – 2015
Borja Angoitia – Rio Grande Valley FC Toros, Toronto FC II – 2017–18
Jesjua Angoy-Cruyff – Dayton Dutch Lions – 2014
Álvaro Antón – FC Cincinnati – 2016
Jon Bakero – Tulsa Roughnecks, Toronto FC II, Phoenix Rising – 2018–21
José Barril – Harrisburg City Islanders, Oklahoma City Energy – 2014–18
Miguel Berry – San Diego Loyal – 2020–21
Victor Blasco – Whitecaps FC 2 – 2015
Oriol Cortes – Orange County Blues – 2016
Ander Egiluz – El Paso Locomotive – 2022–
Ayoze García – Indy Eleven – 2018–22
Jorge González – Portland Timbers 2, Louisville City – 2020–
Josu – Wilmington Hammerheads, FC Cincinnati – 2016–18
Keko – Sacramento Republic – 2022–
Ignacio Maganto – LA Galaxy II – 2015
Fran Martínez – Wilmington Hammerheads – 2015
Santi Moar – Bethlehem Steel, New Mexico United, Phoenix Rising – 2017–
Victor Muñoz – Arizona United – 2015
Marc Navarro – El Paso Locomotive – 2023–
Arturo Ordoñez – Pittsburgh Riverhounds – 2022–
Javi Pérez – Phoenix Rising – 2019
Ian Pino – Louisville City – 2022–
Cristian Portilla – Ottawa Fury – 2018
Jordi Quintillà – Swope Park Rangers – 2016
David Rabadán – Philadelphia Union II – 2020
Ruxi – FC Tulsa – 2023–
David Sierra – Sevilla FC Puerto Rico – 2011
Toni Soler – New Mexico United – 2019
Enric Vallès – Harrisburg City Islanders – 2015
Koke Vegas – San Diego Loyal – 2022–
Damià Viader – Sacramento Republic – 2022–
Yuma – El Paso Locomotive – 2019–

Sweden
Mark Lindstrom – Pittsburgh Riverhounds – 2020
Adam Lundqvist – Rio Grande Valley FC Toros – 2018
Erik McCue – Rio Grande Valley FC Toros, Charleston Battery – 2019–
Robert Mirosavic – Swope Park Rangers – 2017
Linus Olsson – Oklahoma City Energy – 2016
Axel Sjöberg – San Antonio FC – 2020–21

Switzerland
Didier Crettenand – Orange County Blues – 2015–16
Fabio Morelli – FC Montreal – 2015–16
Brandon Onkony – Toronto FC II – 2017–18
Tim Schmoll – New York Red Bulls II – 2016–17
Nick von Niederhäusern – Reno 1868 – 2017
Kay Voser – Charlotte Independence – 2018

Turkey
Emir Tombul – New York Red Bulls II – 2021

Ukraine
Andriy Budnyi – Wilmington Hammerheads, VSI Tampa Bay – 2011–13
Artem Kholod – El Paso Locomotive – 2022–
Denys Kostyshyn – El Paso Locomotive – 2023–

Wales
Chad Bond – Los Angeles Blues, Sacramento Republic, Tulsa Roughnecks, Saint Louis FC, Oklahoma City Energy – 2012, 2014–17
Jonathan Brown – Oklahoma City Energy, Hartford Athletic – 2017–21
Robert Earnshaw – Whitecaps FC 2 – 2015
Gareth Evans – Wilmington Hammerheads, Oklahoma City Energy – 2011–16
Josh Heard – Bethlehem Steel, Real Monarchs – 2016–19
Adam Henley – Real Monarchs – 2018
Anthony Pulis – Orlando City – 2012–14
Matt Whatley – Tulsa Roughnecks – 2016
Owain Fôn Williams – Indy Eleven – 2018

CONMEBOL

Argentina
Ignacio Bailone – San Antonio FC – 2020, 2022–
Fernando Matías Benítez – Atlanta United 2 – 2021
Santiago Biglieri – Portland Timbers 2 – 2015
Gerardo Bruna – Ottawa Fury – 2017–18
Juan Pablo Caffa – Tulsa Roughnecks, Fresno FC – 2017–19
Jonathan Caparelli – Real Monarchs – 2015–17
Tomás Conechny – Portland Timbers 2 – 2018–20
Sebastián Contreras – El Paso Locomotive – 2019
Emil Cuello – LA Galaxy II, San Antonio FC, Sacramento Republic, Phoenix Rising – 2019, 2021–
Nicolás Czornomaz – Orange County SC – 2018
Gonzalo Di Renzo – San Antonio FC – 2020
Leo Díaz – Las Vegas Lights – 2023–
Franco Escobar – Atlanta United 2 – 2019
Gastón Fernández – Portland Timbers 2 – 2015
Lucas Fernández – Rochester Rhinos – 2012–13
Matías Fissore – Oakland Roots – 2021–22
Walter Gaitán – Los Angeles Blues – 2011
Nicolás Giménez – Real Monarchs – 2020
Brian Gómez – San Antonio FC – 2019
Gabriel Gómez – Loudoun United – 2020
Emmanuel Ledesma – FC Cincinnati, Indy Eleven – 2018, 2021
Santiago Maidana – Tulsa Roughnecks – 2018
Juan Mare – Real Monarchs – 2017–18
Lucas Melano – Portland Timbers 2 – 2018
Mariano Miño – Toronto FC II – 2018
Martín Morello – River Plate Puerto Rico – 2011
Cristian Ojeda – Portland Timbers 2 – 2019
Luis Olivera – Sporting Kansas City II – 2019
Norberto Paparatto – Portland Timbers 2 – 2015
Cristian Parano – San Antonio FC – 2019–20, 2022–
Gustavo Paruolo – River Plate Puerto Rico – 2011
Lucas Paulini – Richmond Kickers – 2016
Rocco Ríos Novo – Atlanta United 2, Phoenix Rising – 2021–
Pablo Rossi – Seattle Sounders FC 2 – 2015
Pablo Ruíz – Real Monarchs – 2018–19
Valentin Sabella – Charlotte Independence – 2019–21
Lucas Scaglia – Las Vegas Lights – 2019
Luis Solignac – San Antonio FC, El Paso Locomotive – 2020–
Guido Vadalá – Charlotte Independence – 2020
Federico Varela – Phoenix Rising – 2023–
Joaquín Varela – San Antonio FC – 2021–
Daniel Vega – Tampa Bay Rowdies – 2018
Matías Zaldívar – Rio Grande Valley FC Toros – 2018

Bolivia
Antonio Bustamante – Loudoun United – 2019
Bruno Miranda – Richmond Kickers – 2018

Brazil
Adriano – Los Angeles Blues – 2011
Adriano Francisco – Puerto Rico United – 2011
Alex Freitas – VSI Tampa Bay – 2013
Alexsander – Swope Park Rangers – 2019
Amarildo – New York Red Bulls II – 2019
Anderson Conceição – Bethlehem Steel – 2016
André Lima – Austin Bold – 2019–20
Antonio Neto – VSI Tampa Bay – 2013
Ayrton – Swope Park Rangers – 2016
Beckham – Dayton Dutch Lions – 2014
Bruno Lapa – Birmingham Legion, Memphis 901 – 2020–
Bruno Perone – Wilmington Hammerheads – 2016
Diego Faria – Phoenix FC – 2013
Diego Martins – Charlotte Eagles – 2011
Diego Walsh – Charleston Battery – 2011
Douglas dos Santos – VSI Tampa Bay – 2013
Erick – Harrisburg City Islanders – 2015
Fernando Timbó – Austin Aztex, Orlando City B – 2015, 2017
Fred – Bethlehem Steel – 2016
Gabriel Alves – Birmingham Legion – 2023–
Gabriel Torres – Hartford Athletic, FC Tulsa, Phoenix Rising – 2020–
Gerson dos Santos – Richmond Kickers – 2011–12
Gilberto – Sacramento Republic FC – 2014–15
Guaraci – Austin Aztex – 2015
Gui Brandao – Charlotte Eagles – 2014
Guilherme – Dayton Dutch Lions – 2014
Gustavo Rissi – Austin Bold, Indy Eleven – 2019–21, 2023–
Ivan Magalhães – Rio Grande Valley FC Toros, Tampa Bay Rowdies – 2016–18
Jackson – Fresno FC – 2019
Jeanderson – Portland Timbers 2 – 2015
Juninho – Puerto Rico United – 2011
Kléber – Austin Bold – 2019–20
Leandro Carrijó – El Paso Locomotive – 2020–21
Lennon – Real Monarchs – 2015–16
Leo Fernandes – Harrisburg City Islanders, Bethlehem Steel, Tampa Bay Rowdies – 2013–14, 2016–
Léo Pereira – Orlando City B – 2017
Leonardo – LA Galaxy II, Orange County SC – 2014, 2016, 2019
Luan – Harrisburg City Islanders – 2014
Luca Lobo – Tulsa Roughnecks – 2019
Lucas Baldin – Real Monarchs – 2015
Lucas Cordeiro – Tulsa Roughnecks – 2015
Lucas Coutinho – FC Tulsa – 2021
Lucas Turci – Memphis 901 – 2022–
Lucas Farias – Indy Eleven – 2019
Luiz Fernando – Richmond Kickers, Atlanta United 2, Memphis 901 – 2016–20, 2022–
Maicon – FC Tulsa – 2020
Marcelo Sarvas – LA Galaxy II – 2014
Marlon – FC Tulsa, Birmingham Legion – 2019–22
Matheus Diovany – Dayton Dutch Lions – 2014
Matheus Rossetto – Atlanta United 2 – 2021
Matheus Silva – Arizona United, Reno 1868, Swope Park Rangers, Hartford Athletic, FC Tulsa – 2016–18, 2020, 2022
Mauricio Salles – Charlotte Eagles, VSI Tampa Bay – 2012–13
Nathan Fogaça – San Antonio FC – 2021
Nicolas Firmino – Atlanta United 2 – 2022–
Netinho – Phoenix FC – 2013
Oliver – Richmond Kickers – 2017
Paulo Pita – North Carolina FC – 2020
PC – Orlando City B, San Antonio FC – 2017, 2020–
Pecka – Real Monarchs, San Antonio FC, North Carolina FC – 2015, 2017–20
Pedro Ribeiro – Harrisburg City Islanders, Orlando City B, Fresno FC – 2014, 2016–18
Rafael Mentzingen – Memphis 901 – 2020
Raimar – Atlanta United 2 – 2022–
Reiner Ferreira – Indy Eleven – 2018
Renan – Tulsa Roughnecks – 2019
Renan Boufleur – Phoenix FC, Orlando City – 2013
Richard Isberner – Wilmington Hammerheads – 2013
Rodolfo – Fresno FC, Atlanta United 2 – 2018
Rodrigo da Costa – FC Tulsa – 2019–
Rômulo Peretta – Richmond Kickers – 2016
Sérgio – Seattle Sounders FC 2 – 2015
Stefano Pinho – Austin Bold, Indy Eleven – 2021–
Tadeu Terra – FC New York – 2011
Taiberson – Rio Grande Valley FC Toros – 2020
Thiago De Freitas – Ottawa Fury – 2019
Tiago Calvano – Penn FC – 2017–18
Ualefi – Swope Park Rangers – 2016
Victor Araujo – San Antonio FC – 2016–17
Victor Souto – Pittsburgh Riverhounds – 2017
Vini Dantas – Pittsburgh Riverhounds – 2015
Vinicius – Orange County SC – 2019

Chile
José Bizama – Charlotte Independence – 2021
Fabián Cerda – Tulsa Roughnecks – 2017–18
Claudio Muñoz – Tulsa Roughnecks – 2018
Adolfo Ovalle – Real Monarchs – 2015
Vicente Reyes – Atlanta United 2 – 2020–
Diego Rubio – Swope Park Rangers – 2016–18
Jorge Troncoso – Austin Bold – 2019–21
Francisco Ugarte – Tulsa Roughnecks – 2017–18
Gustavo Zamudio – Rochester Rhinos – 2012

Colombia
José Angulo – Harrisburg City Islanders, Pittsburgh Riverhounds, Saint Louis FC, Oklahoma City Energy, Hartford Athletic – 2011, 2013–14, 2017–19
Juan Arbelaez – Richmond Kickers – 2013–14
Victor Arboleda – Portland Timbers 2 – 2016–17
Andres Arcila – Rio Grande Valley FC Toros – 2019
Jhonny Arteaga – FC New York, Pittsburgh Riverhounds – 2011, 2013–15
Dairon Asprilla – Portland Timbers 2 – 2015–19
Daniel Bedoya – New York Red Bulls II, Hartford Athletic – 2015, 2019
Kley Bejarano – Colorado Springs Switchbacks – 2015
Cristian Bonilla – San Antonio FC – 2022
Michael Bustamante – Charlotte Independence – 2015
Juan Cabezas – Rio Grande Valley FC Toros – 2019, 2021–
David Cabrera – Rio Grande Valley FC Toros – 2018–19
Wilmer Cabrera Jr. – Rio Grande Valley FC Toros – 2018–19
Vincenzo Candela – Charleston Battery – 2018–19
Juan Castillo – New York Red Bulls II – 2021–
Rafael Castillo – San Antonio FC – 2016–19
Héctor Copete – Rio Grande Valley FC Toros – 2019
Francisco Córdoba – Charlotte Independence – 2015
Andrés Correa – Seattle Sounders FC 2 – 2015
Santiago Echavarría – Las Vegas Lights – 2019–20
Olmes García – Real Monarchs – 2016
Frank Gaviria – Rio Grande Valley FC Toros – 2022–
Brayan Gómez – Real Monarchs – 2021–
Mário Gómez – Charlotte Eagles – 2014
Manny González – Tulsa Roughnecks – 2019
Juan Guzmán – Charlotte Eagles, Louisville City, Oklahoma City Energy, New Mexico United – 2011–15, 2017–21
Felipe Hernández – Sporting Kansas City II – 2017–
Jorge Herrera – Charlotte Eagles, Charlotte Independence – 2011–19
Juan Sebastián Herrera – Sacramento Republic – 2023–
Cristian Higuita – Orlando City B – 2016
Mauro Manotas – Rio Grande Valley FC Toros – 2016
Jimmy Medranda – Oklahoma City Energy, Swope Park Rangers, Tacoma Defiance – 2014, 2016, 2019, 2021
Sergio Mena – Rio Grande Valley FC Toros – 2019
Jonathan Mendoza – Orlando City, Rochester Rhinos, Orlando City B, Harrisburg City Islanders – 2013–17
Camilo Monroy – Rio Grande Valley FC Toros – 2017–19
Juan Niño – Charlotte Eagles, San Antonio FC – 2013, 2017
Junior Palacios – Miami FC – 2021–
Carlos Patiño – Seattle Sounders FC 2 – 2015–16
Santiago Patiño – San Antonio FC – 2021–
Martín Payares – El Paso Locomotive – 2022–
Anuar Peláez – Oakland Roots – 2023–
Juan David Ramírez – Austin Bold – 2019
Bryam Rebellón – LA Galaxy II, Swope Park Rangers, El Paso Locomotive, Indy Eleven – 2016, 2018–
Wálter Restrepo – Bethlehem Steel, Tampa Bay Rowdies, San Antonio FC – 2016–17, 2019
Andrés Reyes – New York Red Bulls II – 2021–22
Kevin Riascos – Charlotte Independence – 2021
Carlos Rivas – New York Red Bulls II – 2018
Dani Rovira – Pittsburgh Riverhounds – 2019–
John Henry Sánchez – Rio Grande Valley FC Toros – 2021–
Kevin Saucedo – Real Monarchs – 2021–
Eddie Segura – Las Vegas Lights – 2022
Sebastián Velásquez – Real Monarchs, El Paso Locomotive, Miami FC – 2017–22
Eduard Zea – Arizona United – 2015

Ecuador
Camilo Benítez – Swope Park Rangers – 2018
Jeciel Cedeno – New York Red Bulls II, Hartford Athletic – 2019, 2021–
Victor Manosalvas – New York Red Bulls II – 2015
Andrés Mendoza – Wilmington Hammerheads – 2015
Jose Nazareno – Charleston Battery – 2016
Stiven Plaza – New York Red Bulls II – 2022
Josimar Quintero – Real Monarchs – 2021–
Nicholas Rabiu – New York Red Bulls II – 2021–

Paraguay
Erik López – Atlanta United 2 – 2021

Peru
Nelson Becerra – Harrisburg City Islanders – 2011
Gerardo Bravo – Los Angeles Blues – 2011
Jhonny Bravo – Los Angeles Blues – 2011
Renato Bustamante – Fresno FC – 2018–19
Collin Fernandez – Louisville City, Saint Louis FC, Tulsa Roughnecks, Phoenix Rising, Tacoma Defiance, Austin Bold – 2017–
Marcos López – Reno 1868 – 2020
David Mejia – Atlanta United 2 – 2020–

Uruguay
Sebastián Guenzatti – Tampa Bay Rowdies – 2017–
Alex Martínez – Orange County Blues, Charlotte Independence – 2014–19
Enzo Martínez – Charlotte Independence, Birmingham Legion – 2015–17, 2019–
Nicolás Mezquida – Whitecaps FC 2 – 2015
Lucas Monzón – New York Red Bulls II – 2021–22
Bryan Olivera – LA Galaxy II – 2015
Jhon Pírez – Tulsa Roughnecks – 2018
Max Rauhofer – Real Monarchs, Orange County Blues – 2015–17
Diego Rodríguez – Whitecaps FC 2 – 2015
Vicente Sánchez – Rio Grande Valley FC Toros – 2021–
Marcelo Silva – Real Monarchs – 2018
Santiago Viera – San Antonio FC – 2020

Venezuela
Manuel Arteaga – Indy Eleven, Phoenix Rising – 2021–
Juan Carlos Azócar – Rio Grande Valley FC Toros, Oakland Roots – 2020–
Jovanny Bolívar – Loudoun United – 2021
Pablo Bonilla – Portland Timbers 2 – 2020
Wikelman Carmona – New York Red Bulls II – 2021–
Cristian Cásseres Jr. – New York Red Bulls II – 2018–19
Jesús Castellano – New York Red Bulls II – 2022
Mauro Cichero – Charleston Battery – 2020–22
Alejandro Fuenmayor – Rio Grande Valley FC Toros, Oakland Roots, Phoenix Rising – 2019, 2022–
Christian Gómez – Hartford Athletic – 2021
Juan Guerra – Indy Eleven – 2018
José Hernández – Atlanta United 2 – 2018–19
Ronald Hernández – Atlanta United 2 – 2021
Brayan Hurtado – Portland Timbers 2 – 2019
Arnold López – Sacramento Republic – 2023–
Darwin Matheus – Atlanta United 2 – 2021–22
Alejandro Mitrano – Las Vegas Lights – 2023–
Darluis Paz – Loudoun United – 2021–
Eduin Quero – Rio Grande Valley FC Toros – 2021–
Jeizon Ramírez – Real Monarchs – 2021
Edgardo Rito – New York Red Bulls II, Oakland Roots – 2019–20, 2022–
Victor Rojas – Las Vegas Lights – 2019
Luis Manuel Seijas – Phoenix Rising – 2021–
Williams Velásquez – Portland Timbers 2 – 2020
Renzo Zambrano – Portland Timbers 2, Phoenix Rising – 2017–19, 2023–

CAF

Angola
Estrela – Orlando City – 2014
Sergio Manesio – Ottawa Fury – 2017–18

Benin
Femi Hollinger-Janzen – Tulsa Roughnecks, Birmingham Legion – 2018–19
Don Tchilao – LA Galaxy II – 2019

Burkina Faso
Ibrahim Bancé – Real Monarchs – 2021–
Mohamed Kone – Tampa Bay Rowdies – 2019

Burundi
Irakoze Donasiyano – Oklahoma City Energy, Phoenix Rising, Oakland Roots – 2021–
Bienvenue Kanakimana – Atlanta United 2 – 2019
Chancel Ndaye – Las Vegas Lights – 2020

Cameroon
Anatole Abang – New York Red Bulls II – 2015–16, 2018
Thomas Amang – Colorado Springs Switchbacks, San Diego Loyal – 2021–
Brian Anunga – Wilmington Hammerheads, Charleston Battery – 2015, 2017–19
Eric Ati – Wilmington Hammerheads – 2016
Eric Ayuk – Harrisburg City Islanders, Bethlehem Steel – 2015–16, 2018
Christian Bassogog – Wilmington Hammerheads – 2015
Felix Chenkam – Seattle Sounders 2 – 2017–18
Albert Dikwa – Orlando City B, Saint Louis FC, Pittsburgh Riverhounds – 2017–
Pascal Eboussi – Colorado Springs Switchbacks, San Antonio FC – 2017–19
Samuel Edoung-Biyo – Rochester Rhinos – 2017
Rodrigue Ele – Seattle Sounders 2 – 2017–18
Charles Eloundou – Charlotte Independence, Colorado Springs Switchbacks – 2015
Jean Jospin Engola – LA Galaxy II – 2017–18
Axel Essengue – LA Galaxy II – 2021–
Jeannot Esua – Orange County SC – 2017
Lionel Etoundi – Real Monarchs – 2019
Donovan Ewolo – North Carolina FC – 2018–19
William Eyang – Orlando City B, Pittsburgh Riverhounds – 2016, 2022
Faris – Bethlehem Steel – 2018–19
Jacques Haman – FC Montreal – 2015–16
Cyprian Hedrick – Phoenix FC, Oklahoma City Energy, San Antonio FC, FC Tulsa – 2013–20
Steve Kingue – Philadelphia Union II – 2019–20
Olivier Mbaizo – Bethlehem Steel – 2018–19
Jerome Mbekeli – Swope Park Rangers, San Diego Loyal – 2019–20
Fabrice Mbvouvouma – FC Montreal – 2015–16
Alexis Meva – Portland Timbers 2 – 2016
Joseph Nane – Oakland Roots – 2021–
Hassan Ndam – New York Red Bulls II, Charlotte Independence, Miami FC, Orange County SC – 2017–20, 2022
Mark O'Ojong – Seattle Sounders FC 2, San Antonio FC – 2016–17
Marius Obekop – New York Red Bulls II, Orlando City B – 2015–16
Bertrand Owundi – Charlotte Independence – 2018
Moise Pouaty – Colorado Springs Switchbacks – 2017–18
Tabort Etaka Preston – Las Vegas Lights, San Antonio FC, Hartford Athletic, New Mexico United – 2019–
Yann Songo'o – Orlando City – 2013
Ayukokata També – Colorado Springs Switchbacks – 2018
Uzi Tayou – Tulsa Roughnecks – 2018
Nouhou Tolo – Seattle Sounders FC 2 – 2016–18
Duval Wapiwo – North Carolina FC, Sporting Kansas City II – 2019–20
Yomby William – Richmond Kickers – 2011–18
Jules Youmeni – Orlando City B – 2017
Andre Ulrich Zanga – LA Galaxy II – 2017–18

Cape Verde
Graciano Brito – FC New York, Rochester Rhinos – 2011–12
Antonio Correia – Rochester Rhinos – 2017
Steevan Dos Santos – Rochester Rhinos, Ottawa Fury, Pittsburgh Riverhounds, Tampa Bay Rowdies – 2015–22
Wuilito Fernandes – Orange County SC, North Carolina FC – 2017–18
Kévin Oliveira – Swope Park Rangers, Ottawa Fury – 2016–19

Comoros
Alexis Souahy – Louisville City, New Mexico United – 2018–

Congo
Brunallergene Etou – Charlotte Independence, Tampa Bay Rowdies, Pittsburgh Riverhounds – 2020–
Cabwey Kivutuka – Charlotte Independence – 2019
Raddy Ovouka – New Mexico United – 2022–

DR Congo
Jeremy Bokila – Oakland Roots – 2021
Ladislas Bushiri – Los Angeles Blues – 2012
Phanuel Kavita – Real Monarchs, Saint Louis FC, Birmingham Legion – 2015–16, 2018–
Beverly Makangila – San Diego Loyal, Colorado Springs Switchbacks – 2020–
Parfait Mandanda – Hartford Athletic – 2020
Ariel Mbumba – Oakland Roots – 2021–22
Tresor Mbuyu – Charlotte Independence – 2020–21
Enoch Mushagalusa – Sporting Kansas City II, Louisville City – 2020–
Chiró N'Toko – El Paso Locomotive – 2019–20
Michee Ngalina – Bethlehem Steel, Colorado Springs Switchbacks – 2018–19, 2021–22
Ben Numbi – Tacoma Defiance – 2019
Ferrety Sousa – Wilmington Hammerheads, Las Vegas Lights, Sacramento Republic – 2016, 2019, 2022–
Distel Zola – El Paso Locomotive, Charlotte Independence – 2020–21

Eritrea
Yohannes Harish – Oakland Roots – 2021–

Ethiopia
Sammy Kahsai – Pittsburgh Riverhounds – 2019

Gambia
Seedy Bah – Charleston Battery – 2011
Hamza Barry – LA Galaxy II – 2022
Mamadou Danso – North Carolina FC, Portland Timbers 2 – 2018, 2020
Modou Jadama – FC Tulsa, Portland Timbers 2, Atlanta United 2, Hartford Athletic – 2017–
Karamba Janneh – VSI Tampa Bay, Dayton Dutch Lions – 2013–14
Ebrima Jatta – Los Angeles Blues – 2012
Lamin Jawneh – Atlanta United 2, Phoenix Rising – 2020–22
Bubacarr Jobe – Toronto FC II – 2015–17
Ismaila Jome – Nashville SC, Colorado Springs Switchbacks, Austin Bold – 2018–20
Abdoulie Mansally – Rio Grande Valley FC Toros, Charlotte Independence – 2016, 2019
Modou Ndow – Tacoma Defiance – 2019
Baboucarr Njie – Atlanta United 2, Rio Grande Valley FC Toros, Phoenix Rising – 2020–
Amadou Sanyang – Charleston Battery, Seattle Sounders FC 2 – 2012–15
Omar Sowe – New York Red Bulls II – 2019–21
Sainey Touray – Harrisburg City Islanders, Austin Aztex – 2011–13, 2015

Ghana
Aminu Abdallah – Charleston Battery – 2014
Mohammed Abu – San Antonio FC – 2021–
Lalas Abubakar – Pittsburgh Riverhounds – 2017
Geoffrey Acheampong – LA Galaxy II – 2018–19
Ebenezer Ackon – San Antonio FC, San Diego Loyal – 2019, 2022–
Wahab Ackwei – New York Red Bulls II, Loudoun United, Rio Grande Valley FC Toros – 2018, 2021–
Emmanuel Adjetey – Charleston Battery – 2013–16
Kalif Alhassan – Oklahoma City Energy – 2018
Amass Amankona – Real Monarchs, Indy Eleven – 2016, 2018
Elvis Amoh – Loudoun United, Rio Grande Valley FC Toros, Colorado Springs Switchbacks, Hartford Athletic – 2019–
Darren Amoo – Pittsburgh Riverhounds – 2012–13
Richmond Antwi – Phoenix Rising – 2022
Emmanuel Appiah – Charlotte Independence, Swope Park Rangers, Saint Louis FC, LA Galaxy II – 2016–18
Samuel Appiah – Pittsburgh Riverhounds – 2011
Gideon Asante – Charlotte Eagles – 2014
Samuel Asante – Charlotte Eagles, Richmond Kickers – 2013–17
Solomon Asante – Phoenix Rising, Indy Eleven – 2018–
Nii Armah Ashitey – Hartford Athletic – 2021
Anderson Asiedu – Atlanta United 2, Birmingham Legion – 2019–
Francis Atuahene – Oklahoma City Energy, Austin Bold, San Diego Loyal, Memphis 901, Detroit City – 2018–22
Gladson Awako – Phoenix Rising – 2017–18
Jordan Ayimbila – San Antonio FC, Las Vegas Lights – 2022–
Gideon Baah – New York Red Bulls II – 2016–17
Fifi Baiden – Dayton Dutch Lions – 2014
Isaac Bawa – LA Galaxy II – 2020–21
James Bissue – Pittsburgh Riverhounds – 2016
Latif Blessing – Swope Park Rangers – 2017
Panin Boakye – FC Tulsa – 2019–20
Roy Boateng – New York Red Bulls II – 2019–20
Razak Cromwell – Birmingham Legion – 2019–20
Kwasi Donsu – Colorado Springs Switchbacks – 2019
Dennis Dowouna – Miami FC – 2022–
Haminu Draman – Charlotte Independence – 2015
Evans Frimpong – Oklahoma City Energy – 2016
Prosper Kasim – Birmingham Legion – 2019–
Isaac Kissi – Rochester Rhinos – 2011–12
Gershon Koffie – Indy Eleven – 2021
Owusu-Ansah Kontoh – Orange County SC, Phoenix Rising – 2018–20
Enock Kwakwa – Charleston Battery – 2022
Moses Mensah – Birmingham Legion – 2023–
Ropapa Mensah – Harrisburg City Islanders, Nashville SC, Pittsburgh Riverhounds, Sporting Kansas City II – 2017–21
Rudolf Mensah – Birmingham Legion – 2020
Abass Mohamed – Harrisburg City Islanders – 2017
Modou Ndow – Tacoma Defiance – 2019
Rashid Nuhu – New York Red Bulls II – 2019
Anthony Obodai – Phoenix FC, Pittsburgh Riverhounds – 2013–14
Emmanuel Ocran – Real Monarchs – 2017
Dominic Oduro – Tampa Bay Rowdies, Memphis 901, Charleston Battery – 2018–22
Dominic Oduro – Charlotte Independence – 2019
Stephen Okai – Charlotte Eagles, Orange County Blues, Pittsburgh Riverhounds – 2013–17
Kofi Opare – LA Galaxy II, Colorado Springs Switchbacks – 2014, 2019
Edward Opoku – Saint Louis FC, Birmingham Legion – 2018–19
Fredrick Yamoah Opoku – Penn FC – 2017–18
Kwadwo Opoku – Las Vegas Lights – 2021
William Opoku Mensah – Swope Park Rangers – 2019
Eric Oteng – Las Vegas Lights – 2023–
Jeffrey Otoo – Charleston Battery – 2016–17
Kwadwo Poku – Wilmington Hammerheads, Tampa Bay Rowdies – 2015, 2018–19
Fatawu Safiu – Portland Timbers 2, Whitecaps FC 2 – 2015–16
Lloyd Sam – Miami FC – 2020
Fred Sekyere – Charlotte Eagles, Richmond Kickers – 2014–18
Michael Tetteh – Orlando City – 2011
Rashid Tetteh – New Mexico United, FC Tulsa – 2019–
Ema Twumasi – Oklahoma City Energy, Austin Bold – 2018–20
Oscar Umar – Saint Louis FC – 2019–20
Gideon Waja – Toronto FC II – 2018
Ibrahim Yaro – Colorado Springs Switchbacks – 2019
Joshua Yaro – Bethlehem Steel, San Antonio FC, San Diego Loyal – 2016, 2018–21
Michael Yeboah – Las Vegas Lights – 2021–

Guinea
Hadji Barry – Orlando City B, Swope Park Rangers, Ottawa Fury, North Carolina FC, Colorado Springs Switchbacks – 2016–22
Mamadi Camara – Colorado Springs Switchbacks – 2020
Michel Guilavogui – Rochester Rhinos – 2016
Pa Konate – FC Cincinnati – 2018
Florentin Pogba – Atlanta United 2 – 2019
Amara Soumah – Pittsburgh Riverhounds – 2015

Guinea-Bissau
Eti Tavares – Real Monarchs, Tulsa Roughnecks – 2015–16, 2018

Ivory Coast
Ballobi – Tulsa Roughnecks – 2016
Zoumana Diarra – Loudoun United – 2022
Didier Drogba – Phoenix Rising – 2017–18
Levi Houapeu – Rochester Rhinos – 2014
Nanan Houssou – Loudoun United – 2021–
Laurent Kissiedou – Charleston Battery, Atlanta United 2, Memphis 901 – 2017–19, 2021–
Jean-Christophe Koffi – New York Red Bulls II, Memphis 901, Loudoun United – 2019–20, 2022–
Doueugui Mala – Phoenix Rising – 2017–19
Henri Manhebo – Tulsa Roughnecks – 2015–16
Gaoussou Samaké – Loudoun United – 2021–
Abdoul Zanne – Loudoun United – 2022–

Kenya
Handwalla Bwana – Tacoma Defiance, Memphis 901 – 2015–20, 2022–
Philip Mayaka – Colorado Springs Switchbacks – 2021
Joseph Okumu – Real Monarchs – 2018–19
Lawrence Olum – Orlando City, Miami FC – 2011, 2020
Brian Ombiji – Harrisburg City Islanders – 2011–12

Lesotho
Sunny Jane – Wilmington Hammerheads, Richmond Kickers, Louisville City – 2014–17, 2019
Napo Matsoso – Louisville City, Oakland Roots – 2019–

Liberia
Othello Bah – Miami FC – 2020–22
Seku Conneh – Bethlehem Steel, Las Vegas Lights, Monterey Bay FC – 2016–17, 2020, 2022
Gabe Gissie – Sacramento Republic, Bethlehem Steel – 2014–17
DZ Harmon – Charleston Battery – 2021–22
Joel Johnson – Charlotte Independence, Hartford Athletic – 2016–
Mohammed Kamara – LA Galaxy II – 2019
Prince Saydee – Miami FC, Phoenix Rising, Hartford Athletic – 2020–
Patrick Weah – Sacramento Republic – 2021

Libya
Éamon Zayed – Charlotte Independence – 2018

Malawi
Yamikani Chester – North Carolina FC, Las Vegas Lights – 2019–20

Mali
Oumar Ballo – Swope Park Rangers – 2016–17
Mamadou Kansaye – Charlotte Independence – 2015
Ladji Mallé – Las Vegas Lights – 2022–
Zoumana Simpara – New York Red Bulls II – 2016
Aboubacar Sissoko – Indy Eleven – 2021

Mauritius
Ashley Nazira – San Diego Loyal – 2020

Morocco
Ayyoub Allach – Swope Park Rangers – 2019
Hassan Aqboub – Loudoun United – 2022–
Younes Boudadi – Reno 1868, Hartford Athletic, Indy Eleven – 2020–
Youssef Naciri – Harrisburg City Islanders – 2016

Mozambique
Clésio Baúque – Harrisburg City Islanders – 2014

Niger
Kairou Amoustapha – Loudoun United – 2020–21

Nigeria
Temi Adesodun – Charleston Battery – 2020–
Fanendo Adi – FC Cincinnati – 2018
Bolu Akinyode – New York Red Bulls II, Bethlehem Steel, Nashville SC, Birmingham Legion, Miami FC – 2015–16, 2018–
Raphael Ayagwa – FC Tulsa – 2020–21
Bright Dike – Los Angeles Blues – 2012
David Egbo – Phoenix Rising, Memphis 901 – 2021–22
Monday Etim – Orange County SC, Rio Grande Valley FC Toros – 2017–18
Akinjide Idowu – Portland Timbers 2 – 2016
Victor Igbekoyi – North Carolina FC – 2018–19
Solomon Kwambe – FC Tulsa – 2020–
Qudus Lawal – Seattle Sounders FC 2, Wilmington Hammerheads, Fresno FC, San Diego Loyal – 2015–16, 2019–20
Zion Long – Sporting Kansas City II – 2021
Kyrian Nwabueze – Tulsa Roughnecks – 2015
Diba Nwegbo – Birmingham Legion – 2023–
Emenike Nwogu – Atlanta United 2 – 2022–
Stanley Oganbor – FC Tulsa – 2021
Patrick Okonkwo – Charleston Battery, Atlanta United 2 – 2017–19
Rasheed Olabiyi – Harrisburg City Islanders – 2017
Nelson Orji – Atlanta United 2 – 2022–
Isaac Promise – Austin Bold – 2019
Nansel Selbol – Swope Park Rangers, Orange County SC – 2016–18
Mueng Sunday – Oklahoma City Energy – 2021
George Tor – Rochester Rhinos – 2013
Mfon Udoh – FC Tulsa – 2020
Ibrahim Usman – Seattle Sounders 2 – 2018
Tobenna Uzo – Colorado Springs Switchbacks, FC Tulsa – 2017–20
Uchenna Uzo – Phoenix Rising, Pittsburgh Riverhounds – 2016–17, 2019
Henry Uzochokwu – Phoenix Rising – 2023–

Rwanda
Abdul Rwatubyaye – Swope Park Rangers, Colorado Springs Switchbacks – 2019–20

Senegal
Dominique Badji – Charlotte Independence – 2015
Omar Ciss – Austin Bold – 2020–21
Mouhamed Dabo – Harrisburg City Islanders, Pittsburgh Riverhounds, Reno 1868 – 2016–20
Alioune Diakhate – Indy Eleven – 2019
Oumar Diakhite – Orlando City – 2013
Papé Diakité – Tampa Bay Rowdies – 2018–19
Babacar Diallo – Rochester Rhinos – 2014
Cherif Dieye – New York Red Bulls II – 2020
Abdoulaye Diop – Atlanta United 2, Detroit City – 2020–
Amadou Macky Diop – Atlanta United 2, Birmingham Legion, Detroit City – 2020–22
Clément Diop – LA Galaxy II – 2015–17
Ates Diouf – Austin Bold, San Antonio FC – 2020–22
Mamadou Diouf – Charleston Battery – 2014
Djiby Fall – FC Cincinnati – 2017
Mamadou Fall – Las Vegas Lights – 2021
Cheikh M'Baye – New York Red Bulls II – 2016
Justin Malou – FC Tulsa – 2023–
Malick Mbaye – North Carolina FC – 2020
Adama Mbengue – Orlando City – 2012–14
Nago Mbengue – Dayton Dutch Lions – 2013
Alioune Ndour – Loudoun United – 2019–20
Mour Samb – Ottawa Fury, Saint Louis FC – 2019–20
Moussa Sane – Orlando City B – 2017
Abdou Mbacke Thiam – Louisville City – 2019–21
Mohamed Thiaw – Reno 1868, Miami FC – 2018, 2020
Mohamed Traore – Las Vegas Lights, Phoenix Rising – 2021–

Sierra Leone
Shaka Bangura – Richmond Kickers – 2011
Sallieu Bundu – Charlotte Eagles, Charleston Battery, VSI Tampa Bay – 2011–13
Frank Daroma – Las Vegas Lights – 2021–
Mustapha Dumbuya – Phoenix Rising, Tampa Bay Rowdies – 2019–20
Alhaji Kamara – Richmond Kickers – 2017
Michael Lahoud – FC Cincinnati, San Antonio FC – 2018–19
Rodney Michael – Indy Eleven – 2022
Suleiman Samura – Fresno FC, San Diego Loyal – 2019–20
Lamin Suma – Sacramento Republic – 2017
Joseph Toby – Arizona United – 2014
Nate Tongovula – Seattle Sounders FC 2 – 2015
Augustine Williams – Portland Timbers 2, LA Galaxy II, San Diego Loyal, Charleston Battery – 2016–

Somalia
Haji Abdikadir – San Diego Loyal – 2021
Siad Haji – Reno 1868, FC Tulsa – 2019–20, 2023–
Abdi Mohamed – Memphis 901 – 2019
Omar Mohamed – FC Cincinnati, Portland Timbers 2 – 2016–17

South Africa
Stephen Armstrong – Charleston Battery – 2011
Arthur Bosua – Charleston Battery – 2019–20
Thabiso Khumalo – Pittsburgh Riverhounds – 2011
George Lebese – Colorado Springs Switchbacks – 2020
Yazeed Matthews – Detroit City – 2022–
Lindo Mfeka – Reno 1868, Oakland Roots – 2017–19, 2021–
Lebogang Moloto – Pittsburgh Riverhounds, Swope Park Rangers, Nashville SC, FC Tulsa – 2015–22
Tumi Moshobane – San Diego Loyal – 2020–
Gregory Mulamba – Oklahoma City Energy, Austin Aztex – 2015
Ethen Sampson – Whitecaps FC 2, New Mexico United – 2015, 2019
Ty Shipalane – North Carolina FC – 2018
Miguel Timm – Phoenix Rising – 2016–17

South Sudan
Machop Chol – Atlanta United 2 – 2021–
Duach Jock – LA/Orange County Blues – 2013–14

Tanzania
Abdalla Haji Shaibu – LA Galaxy II – 2019
Ally Hamis Ng'anzi – Loudoun United – 2020
Jackson Kasanzu – San Diego Loyal – 2022–

Togo
Shalom Dutey – Charlotte Independence – 2021
Alex Harlley – Pittsburgh Riverhounds, Las Vegas Lights – 2016, 2019
Ayao Sossou – Rochester Rhinos – 2014
Walid Yacoubou – Tulsa Roughnecks, Hartford Athletic – 2019, 2021–

Tunisia
Jasser Khmiri – San Antonio FC – 2021–

Uganda
Micheal Azira – Charleston Battery, Seattle Sounders FC 2, Colorado Springs Switchbacks, New Mexico United – 2012–13, 2015, 2018, 2021–
Henry Kalungi – Richmond Kickers, Charlotte Independence – 2011–18
Edward Kizza – Memphis 901, Pittsburgh Riverhounds – 2022–
Azake Luboyera – Ottawa Fury – 2017–18
Steven Sserwadda – New York Red Bulls II – 2021–22

Zambia
Prosper Chiluya – Bethlehem Steel – 2018
Mutaya Mwape – Charlotte Independence – 2018

Zimbabwe
Joseph Kabwe – Charlotte Eagles – 2012
Leeroy Maguraushe – San Antonio FC – 2019
Lucky Mkosana – Harrisburg City Islanders, Louisville City, Tampa Bay Rowdies – 2012–13, 2018–
Joseph Ngwenya – Richmond Kickers, Pittsburgh Riverhounds – 2013–14
Stanley Nyazamba – Richmond Kickers – 2011–13
Schillo Tshuma – Orange County Blues, Arizona United, Portland Timbers 2, Saint Louis FC – 2014–16

AFC

Afghanistan
David Najem – New York Red Bulls II, Tampa Bay Rowdies, New Mexico United – 2016–

Australia
Panos Armenakas – Loudoun United – 2023–
Jesse Daley – Tacoma Defiance – 2018–20
Harrison Delbridge – Sacramento Republic, Portland Timbers 2, FC Cincinnati – 2014–17
Jamie Dimitroff – Seattle Sounders 2 – 2016–17
Albert Edward – Wilmington Hammerheads – 2014
Yahaya Musa – Wilmington Hammerheads – 2012, 2014
Mitch Osmond – Indy Eleven, Oklahoma City Energy – 2019–21
Adriano Pellegrino – Tulsa Roughnecks – 2016
Liam Rose – El Paso Locomotive – 2022–
Steve Whyte – Seattle Sounders 2 – 2017
Rhys Williams – Detroit City – 2022–

China
Tycho Collins – Memphis 901 – 2021–
Tan Long – Richmond Kickers, Orlando City, Arizona United – 2012–16

Guam
A. J. DeLaGarza – LA Galaxy II, Rio Grande Valley FC Toros – 2015, 2018
Mason Grimes – Tulsa Roughnecks – 2015–16
Dallas Jaye – FC Cincinnati, Monterey Bay FC – 2016–17, 2022
Doug Herrick – Charlotte Eagles – 2014
Alex Lee – Richmond Kickers – 2015–18
Shane Malcolm – Colorado Springs Switchbacks – 2017–19
Shawn Nicklaw – Wilmington Hammerheads, Atlanta United 2 – 2013, 2018
Erik Ustruck – Orlando City – 2011–13

Iran
Amir Abedzadeh – Los Angeles Blues – 2011–12
Shahryar Dastan – Los Angeles Blues – 2011
Mohammad Mohammadi – LA/Orange County Blues – 2013–14
Mehrshad Momeni – LA/Orange County Blues – 2011, 2013–15
Mohammad Roknipour – LA/Orange County Blues – 2013–14
Dariush Yazdani – Los Angeles Blues – 2012–13

Japan
Kenny Akamatsu – New Mexico United – 2019
Jun Marques Davidson – Charlotte Independence – 2016–17
Tsubasa Endoh – Toronto FC II, LA Galaxy II – 2017–19, 2022–
Ryo Fujii – LA Galaxy II – 2015–17
Cy Goddard – Detroit City – 2022–
Shintaro Harada – Pittsburgh Riverhounds, Dayton Dutch Lions, Colorado Springs Switchbacks – 2011–16
Koji Hashimoto – Orange County SC – 2018–19
Masaki Hemmi – Sevilla FC Puerto Rico, Rochester Rhinos – 2011–12
Kotaro Higashi – Charleston Battery – 2017–19
Nozomi Hiroyama – Richmond Kickers – 2011–12
Kodai Iida – Oklahoma City Energy – 2020–21
Yudai Imura – Richmond Kickers – 2015–18
Shinya Kadono – Loudoun United – 2019
Kosuke Kimura – Tulsa Roughnecks, Nashville SC – 2017–19
Daigo Kobayashi – Las Vegas Lights, Birmingham Legion – 2018–21
Hiroki Kobayashi – Seattle Sounders FC 2 – 2015
Ken Krolicki – Portland Timbers 2 – 2020
Hiroki Kurimoto – Fresno FC, Colorado Springs Switchbacks, Oklahoma City Energy – 2019–21
Kota Sakurai – Toronto FC II – 2016
Kentaro Takada – Saint Louis FC – 2015–16
Soya Takahashi – Oakland Roots – 2021–

Jordan
Jaime Siaj – Charlotte Independence, Oklahoma City Energy, Tampa Bay Rowdies – 2017–19

Lebanon
Soony Saad – Swope Park Rangers, Indy Eleven – 2017–18

Pakistan
Kaleemullah Khan – Sacramento Republic, Tulsa Roughnecks – 2015–17

Palestine
Nazmi Albadawi – FC Cincinnati, North Carolina FC – 2018–20

Philippines
Charley Pettys – Los Angeles Blues – 2013

Saudi Arabia
Faris Abdi – Austin Bold – 2019

South Korea
Cho Sun-hyung – Los Angeles Blues – 2012
Kim Do-heon – Indy Eleven – 2019
Kim Seung-ju – Orange County Blues – 2014–15
Kim Tae-seong – Colorado Springs Switchbacks – 2016–18
Kim Tae-woo – Colorado Springs Switchbacks – 2016
Lee Jung-soo – Charlotte Independence – 2018
Lim Choong-sil – Seattle Sounders FC 2 – 2015
Park Cheun-yong – Los Angeles Blues – 2012
Park Jung-yeong – Real Monarchs, Colorado Springs Switchbacks – 2016–17
Son Jong-hyun – Louisville City – 2016

CONCACAF

Antigua and Barbuda
Kimoi Alexander – Antigua Barracuda – 2011–12
Luke Blakely – Antigua Barracuda – 2012
Randolph Burton – Antigua Barracuda – 2011–13
Theo Brown – Antigua Barracuda – 2011
Peter Byers – Antigua Barracuda, Los Angeles Blues – 2011–12
Dave Carr – Antigua Barracuda – 2011
Ranjae Christian – Antigua Barracuda – 2011
Justin Cochrane – Antigua Barracuda – 2011
Keita de Castro – Antigua Barracuda – 2011–12
Omarie Daniel – Antigua Barracuda – 2013
George Dublin – Antigua Barracuda – 2011–13
Troy Dublin – Antigua Barracuda – 2012
Gayson Gregory – Antigua Barracuda – 2011
Roy Gregory – Antigua Barracuda – 2011
Quinton Griffith – Antigua Barracuda, Charleston Battery – 2011–18
Tash Harris – Antigua Barracuda – 2011
Ricardo Harvey – Antigua Barracuda – 2013
Molvin James – Antigua Barracuda – 2011–13
Lloyd Jeremy – Antigua Barracuda – 2012–13
Eugene Kirwan – Antigua Barracuda – 2012–13
Karanja Mack – Antigua Barracuda – 2011–13
Alex Phillip – Antigua Barracuda – 2011, 2013
Hazeley Pyle – Antigua Barracuda – 2012–13
Ralston Phoenix – Antigua Barracuda – 2012–13
Lawson Robinson – Antigua Barracuda – 2011–13
Janiel Simon – Antigua Barracuda – 2013
Kerry Skepple – Antigua Barracuda – 2012
Stefan Smith – Antigua Barracuda, Charlotte Eagles – 2011–13
Jamoy Stevens – Antigua Barracuda – 2013
Javorn Stevens – Seattle Sounders 2 – 2017
Akeem Thomas – Antigua Barracuda – 2011–12
Elvis Thomas – Antigua Barracuda – 2011
Tamorley Thomas – Antigua Barracuda – 2011–13

Bahamas
Happy Hall – Dayton Dutch Lions – 2011

Barbados
Keasel Broome – Harrisburg City Islanders, Pittsburgh Riverhounds – 2016–17

Belize
Deshawon Nembhard – Charleston Battery – 2020
Tony Rocha – Austin Aztex, Orlando City B, Saint Louis FC, Orange County SC – 2015–18, 2022–
Michael Salazar – FC Montreal, Ottawa Fury, Rio Grande Valley FC Toros, Memphis 901, LA Galaxy II, Miami FC – 2016–19, 2021–

Bermuda
Dante Leverock – Harrisburg City Islanders – 2015–16
Zeiko Lewis – New York Red Bulls II, Charleston Battery, Sacramento Republic – 2017, 2019–
Taurean Manders – Antigua Barracuda – 2013

Costa Rica
Alejandro Aguilar – Pittsburgh Riverhounds – 2016
Erick Cabalceta – Saint Louis FC – 2017
Michael Calderón – Wilmington Hammerheads – 2014
Julio Cascante – Portland Timbers 2 – 2018
Dennis Castillo – Charlotte Independence – 2016–17
Walter Cortés – Bethlehem Steel – 2019
César Elizondo – San Antonio FC – 2016–18
Ricky Garbanzo – Charleston Battery – 2015–17
Dan Jackson – Colorado Springs Switchbacks – 2016–17
Shaquille Jimenez – Portland Timbers 2 – 2017
Ariel Lassiter – LA Galaxy II – 2015–18
Marvin Loría – Portland Timbers 2 – 2018–19
Roy Miller – New York Red Bulls II, Portland Timbers 2 – 2015, 2019
Josue Monge – Bethlehem Steel – 2016–17
Brandon Poltronieri – Arizona United – 2016
Yostin Salinas – New York Red Bulls II – 2022–
Orlando Sinclair – Loudoun United – 2019
Mauricio Vargas – Pittsburgh Riverhounds – 2016
Rodney Wallace – Arizona United – 2014

Cuba
Yordany Álvarez – Orlando City – 2011, 2014
Raiko Arozarena – Tampa Bay Rowdies – 2021–
Yeniel Bermúdez – River Plate Puerto Rico, Los Angeles Blues – 2011
Maikel Chang – Charleston Battery, Real Monarchs – 2013–19, 2021
Odisnel Cooper – Charleston Battery – 2013–18
Heviel Cordovés – Charleston Battery, Richmond Kickers – 2013–18
Jorge Corrales – FC Tulsa – 2017, 2021–
Adrián Diz – Portland Timbers 2, Colorado Springs Switchbacks, Rio Grande Valley FC Toros, FC Tulsa, Indy Eleven – 2018–
Miguel Ferrer – Charlotte Eagles – 2012–13
Waylon Francis – Seattle Sounders 2 – 2018
Maykel Galindo – Los Angeles Blues – 2012–13
Erlys García – LA/Orange County Blues – 2011–14
Frank López – LA Galaxy II, San Antonio FC, Oklahoma City Energy, Sacramento Republic, Rio Grande Valley FC Toros – 2018–
Ariel Martínez – FC Tulsa, Miami FC, Hartford Athletic, Tampa Bay Rowdies – 2020–
Julio Maya – River Plate Puerto Rico – 2011
José Miranda – Puerto Rico United, LA/Orange County Blues – 2011–12, 2014–15
Héctor Morales – Miami FC – 2020
Frank Nodarse – Charleston Battery, Rio Grande Valley FC Toros – 2021–
Luis Paradela – Reno 1868 – 2019
Geobel Pérez – Charleston Battery – 2021–22
Yaikel Pérez – River Plate Puerto Rico – 2011
Daniel Luis Sáez – Rio Grande Valley FC Toros – 2022–
Darío Suárez – FC Tulsa – 2020–

Curaçao
Zeus de la Paz – Oakland Roots – 2021
Denzel Slager – Orange County Blues, LA Galaxy II – 2015–16
Ayrton Statie – Reno 1868 – 2020

Dominican Republic
Edison Azcona – El Paso Locomotive – 2022
Rafael Díaz – New York Red Bulls II, Sacramento Republic, Monterey Bay FC – 2015–22
Josh García – Oklahoma City Energy – 2019

El Salvador
Juan Barahona – Sacramento Republic – 2019–20
Marvin Baumgartner – Real Monarchs – 2015
Nelson Blanco – North Carolina FC – 2018
Junior Burgos – Orange County Blues, Reno 1868, Las Vegas Lights – 2015, 2017, 2020
Eric Calvillo – Reno 1868, Orange County SC, El Paso Locomotive – 2018–
Derby Carrillo – FC New York – 2011
Darwin Cerén – Orlando City – 2014
Alexis Cerritos – Loudoun United, Orange County SC, Rio Grande Valley FC Toros – 2019–21
Anibal Echeverria – Reno 1868 – 2017
Andres Flores – Portland Timbers 2, Rio Grande Valley FC Toros – 2019, 2021
Jeremy Garay – Loudoun United – 2019–
Tomás Granitto – Swope Park Rangers, Portland Timbers 2, Miami FC – 2016–17, 2020
Romilio Hernandez – Phoenix Rising, Rio Grande Valley FC Toros – 2017–19
Jairo Henríquez – Colorado Springs Switchbacks – 2022–
Irvin Herrera – Saint Louis FC – 2016–17
Juan Herrera-Perla – Las Vegas Lights – 2018
Walmer Martinez – Hartford Athletic, Monterey Bay FC – 2021–
Richard Menjívar – Penn FC – 2018
Edwin Miranda – Los Angeles Blues – 2011
Roberto Molina – Las Vegas Lights – 2021–
Amando Moreno – New York Red Bulls II, New Mexico United – 2018, 2020–
Maikon Orellana – Real Monarchs – 2015–17
Joshua Pérez – Phoenix Rising, Miami FC – 2018–19, 2021–
Steve Purdy – Orange County Blues – 2016
Christopher Ramírez – Orange County Blues – 2015
Joaquin Rivas – Sacramento Republic, FC Tulsa, Saint Louis FC, Miami FC – 2015–
Christian Rodriguez – Tulsa Roughnecks – 2018
Ronald Rodríguez – FC Tulsa – 2022
Alex Roldan – Tacoma Defiance – 2018–20
Alexander Romero – Las Vegas Lights – 2023–
Tomás Romero – Bethlehem Steel, Las Vegas Lights – 2018–22
Allexon Saravia – Loudoun United – 2019–21
Christian Sorto – Loudoun United, Rio Grande Valley FC Toros, Miami FC – 2019–

French Guiana
Thomas Vancaeyezeele – Pittsburgh Riverhounds, San Diego Loyal, Birmingham Legion, Tampa Bay Rowdies – 2018–22

Grenada
Kharlton Belmar – Portland Timbers 2, Swope Park Rangers, Nashville SC, Sacramento Republic, Colorado Springs Switchbacks – 2015–
Jamal Charles – Real Monarchs – 2018
Benjamin Ettienne – Charleston Battery – 2022–
Shavon John-Brown – El Paso Locomotive – 2022
Alexander McQueen – Indy Eleven – 2022
A. J. Paterson – Bethlehem Steel, Charleston Battery – 2018–

Guadeloupe
Luther Archimède – New York Red Bulls II, Sacramento Republic – 2021–
Ronald Zubar – New York Red Bulls II – 2015

Guatemala
Pablo Aguilar – Rio Grande Valley FC Toros – 2018
Moisés Hernández – San Antonio FC – 2018–19
Darwin Lom – Hartford Athletic – 2021
Jefrey Payeras – Orange County Blues, LA Galaxy II – 2015–18
Jasson Ramos Carpio – Tulsa Roughnecks – 2016
Arian Recinos – New York Red Bulls II – 2022–
Nico Rittmeyer – Charleston Battery – 2017–20
Rodrigo Saravia – Pittsburgh Riverhounds, Swope Park Rangers – 2016, 2018
Allen Yanes – New York Red Bulls II – 2018–19

Guyana
Brandon Beresford – Rochester Rhinos – 2016–17
Jordan Dover – Rochester Rhinos, Pittsburgh Riverhounds – 2017–21
Keanu Marsh-Brown – Memphis 901 – 2020
Kayode McKinnon – Antigua Barracuda – 2011
Walter Moore – Charlotte Eagles – 2011
Emery Welshman – Real Monarchs, FC Cincinnati – 2015–16, 2018

Haiti
Jean Alexandre – Orlando City – 2012–13
Ashkanov Apollon – Sacramento Republic, Hartford Athletic – 2020–
Shanyder Borgelin – Philadelphia Union II – 2019–20
Steward Ceus – Colorado Springs Switchbacks – 2018–19
Ronaldo Damus – Orange County SC – 2021
Jonel Désiré – Real Monarchs – 2017
Sebastian Elney – New York Red Bulls II, Hartford Athletic – 2019–21
Derrick Etienne – New York Red Bulls II – 2015–19
Max Ferdinand – Rochester Rhinos – 2011
Christiano François – Richmond Kickers, Rochester Rhinos, Pittsburgh Riverhounds, Ottawa Fury, Reno 1868, Miami FC, El Paso Locomotive, Rio Grande Valley FC Toros – 2014, 2017–
Jacques Francois – San Antonio FC – 2016
Jems Geffrard – FC Montreal, Fresno FC – 2015–16, 2019
Alain Gustave – Sevilla FC Puerto Rico – 2011
Zachary Herivaux – San Antonio FC, Birmingham Legion, Tampa Bay Rowdies – 2017, 2019–
Bitielo Jean Jacques – River Plate Puerto Rico, VSI Tampa Bay, Orlando City – 2011, 2013–14
Andrew Jean-Baptiste – Los Angeles Blues, New York Red Bulls II – 2012, 2015
Mechack Jérôme – Orlando City, Charlotte Independence, El Paso Locomotive, Indy Eleven – 2011–12, 2015, 2019–
James Marcelin – Antigua Barracuda – 2013
Fredlin Mompremier – Tulsa Roughnecks, Sporting Kansas City II – 2019–20
Bony Pierre – FC New York – 2011
Groutchov Pierre – Oklahoma City Energy – 2021
Widner Saint-Cyr – Arizona United – 2014
Carl Sainté – New Mexico United – 2022–
Jimmy-Shammar Sanon – FC Montreal, Ottawa Fury – 2016–18
Sébastien Thurière – VSI Tampa Bay, Dayton Dutch Lions, Charleston Battery, San Antonio FC – 2013–16
Max Touloute – Pittsburgh Riverhounds – 2015
Denso Ulysse – Tacoma Defiance – 2017–19
Kénold Versailles – Rochester Rhinos – 2011

Honduras
Danilo Acosta – Real Monarchs, LA Galaxy II, Orange County SC – 2015–16, 2018, 2021–
Christian Altamirano – FC Tulsa – 2019–20
Franklin Castellanos – New York Red Bulls II – 2015
Alessandro Castro – Atlanta United 2 – 2018–19
Gerson Chávez – LA Galaxy II – 2021
Carlos Contreras – Colorado Springs Switchbacks – 2015
Wesly Decas – Atlanta United 2 – 2019
José Escalante – Rio Grande Valley FC Toros, San Antonio FC – 2016–18
Deybi Flores – Whitecaps FC 2 – 2015–17
Devron García – Orlando City B – 2016
Angelo Kelly-Rosales – Charleston Battery, Pittsburgh Riverhounds – 2018–22
Douglas Martínez – New York Red Bulls II, Real Monarchs, San Diego Loyal, Sacramento Republic – 2017, 2019, 2021–
Juan Carlos Obregón Jr. – Rio Grande Valley FC Toros, Hartford Athletic – 2019–22
Milton Palacios – San Antonio FC – 2016
Marlon Ramírez – Charleston Battery, FC Tulsa – 2014, 2022
Brayan Reyes – FC Tulsa – 2019–20
Bryan Róchez – Orlando City B – 2016
César Romero – Colorado Springs Switchbacks – 2019
Junior Sandoval – Memphis 901, Las Vegas Lights – 2019–20
Elder Torres – Real Monarchs – 2016

Jamaica
Nathaniel Adamolekun – Austin Bold – 2020–21
Jahshaun Anglin – Miami FC – 2021
Akeil Barrett – Swope Park Rangers, Tulsa Roughnecks – 2016, 2019
Zaire Bartley – New York Red Bulls II – 2017
Deshane Beckford – Rio Grande Valley FC Toros, Colorado Springs Switchbacks, San Antonio FC – 2019–
Cardel Benbow – Harrisburg City Islanders – 2015–17
Kieron Bernard – Orlando City – 2011–13
Navion Boyd – Charleston Battery – 2012, 2015
Neco Brett – Portland Timbers 2, Pittsburgh Riverhounds, Birmingham Legion, New Mexico United – 2016–
Amoy Brown – Bethlehem Steel – 2016–17
Brian Brown – Charlotte Independence, Reno 1868, New Mexico United, Oakland Roots, FC Tulsa – 2016–19, 2021–22
Deshorn Brown – Tampa Bay Rowdies, Oklahoma City Energy, Sacramento Republic – 2017–19, 2022–
Cory Burke – Bethlehem Steel – 2016–18
Andrae Campbell – Wilmington Hammerheads, Orange County Blues, Ottawa Fury – 2014–17
Sergio Campbell – Austin Aztex, Pittsburgh Riverhounds, Rochester Rhinos – 2015–17
Dennis Chin – Orlando City, Arizona United, Pittsburgh Riverhounds – 2011–15, 2018
Rennico Clarke – Portland Timbers 2, Swope Park Rangers, Charleston Battery – 2015–17, 2019–20
Omar Cummings – FC Cincinnati – 2016–17
Nicque Daley – Charleston Battery – 2019–21
Omar Daley – Oklahoma City Energy – 2015
Rashawn Dally – Memphis 901, Las Vegas Lights, Hartford Athletic – 2019–
Martin Davis – Toronto FC II – 2015–17
Simon Dawkins – Monterey Bay FC – 2022–
Richard Dixon – VSI Tampa Bay, Charlotte Eagles, Saint Louis FC, Oklahoma City Energy – 2013–18
Shaquille Dyer – Harrisburg City Islanders – 2015
Ashani Fairclough – Wilmington Hammerheads, Seattle Sounders FC 2, Charlotte Independence – 2014–17
Oniel Fisher – Seattle Sounders FC 2 – 2015–16
Junior Flemmings – New York Red Bulls II, Tampa Bay Rowdies, Phoenix Rising, Birmingham Legion – 2016–21
Kenardo Forbes – Rochester Rhinos, Pittsburgh Riverhounds – 2015–
Craig Foster – Harrisburg City Islanders – 2015–16
Maalique Foster – Rio Grande Valley FC Toros, Sacramento Republic – 2019, 2021–
Shaun Francis – Charlotte Eagles, Louisville City – 2013, 2018–19
Kevaughn Frater – Real Monarchs, Colorado Springs Switchbacks, Phoenix Rising, New Mexico United – 2016–19, 2022–
Owayne Gordon – San Antonio FC, Oklahoma City Energy, Austin Bold – 2017–21
Ewan Grandison – Memphis 901 – 2019
Anthony Grant – Richmond Kickers – 2015–17
Brenton Griffiths – Orange County Blues, Reno 1868, Miami FC – 2014–18, 2020
Jamiel Hardware – Harrisburg City Islanders, Saint Louis FC – 2013–16
Christopher Harvey – Antigua Barracuda – 2011
Omar Holness – Real Monarchs, Bethlehem Steel – 2016–18
Kenroy Howell – Pittsburgh Riverhounds – 2017
Ramone Howell – Nashville SC – 2018–19
Jorginho James – Rio Grande Valley FC Toros – 2016–18
Jason Johnson – Pittsburgh Riverhounds, San Antonio FC, Phoenix Rising, Louisville City, Austin Bold, FC Tulsa, Monterey Bay FC – 2014, 2016–22
Dane Kelly – Charleston Battery, Swope Park Rangers, Reno 1868, Richmond Kickers, Indy Eleven, Charlotte Independence, Pittsburgh Riverhounds – 2011–
Lance Laing – FC Cincinnati, San Antonio FC – 2018–19
Kevon Lambert – Phoenix Rising – 2017–
Andre Lewis – Charleston Battery, Whitecaps FC 2, Portland Timbers 2, Colorado Springs Switchbacks, Hartford Athletic – 2014–18, 2020–
Damion Lowe – Seattle Sounders FC 2, Tampa Bay Rowdies, Phoenix Rising – 2015, 2017, 2020
Jermie Dwayne Lynch – Saint Louis FC, Wilmington Hammerheads – 2015–16
Darren Mattocks – Phoenix Rising – 2021
Kimarley McDonald – Antigua Barracuda – 2011
Sean McFarlane – Colorado Springs Switchbacks, Austin Bold, Miami FC, FC Tulsa – 2017, 2019–22
Justin McMaster – Bethlehem Steel – 2016–17
Sheldon Parkinson – Phoenix FC – 2013
Romeo Parkes – Pittsburgh Riverhounds, New Mexico United, Miami FC – 2016–18, 2020, 2022–
Christopher Pearson – FC Tulsa – 2022–
Demar Phillips – Real Monarchs, Austin Bold – 2017, 2019
Alvas Powell – Sacramento Republic – 2014
Akeem Priestley – Los Angeles Blues, Dayton Dutch Lions – 2011–12
Rohan Reid – Charlotte Eagles – 2013
Trayvon Reid – Oakland Roots – 2023–
Saeed Robinson – Colorado Springs Switchbacks, El Paso Locomotive – 2015–16, 2018–20
Toric Robinson – Dayton Dutch Lions, Antigua Barracuda – 2012–13
Asani Samuels – Rochester Rhinos – 2015–16
Jordan Scarlett – New York Red Bulls II, Tampa Bay Rowdies, Louisville City – 2017–
Michael Seaton – Richmond Kickers, Portland Timbers 2, Orange County SC – 2013–15, 2018–19
Don Smart – FC New York, Fresno FC – 2011, 2018
Dawyne Smith – Pittsburgh Riverhounds – 2012
Rojay Smith – Sporting Kansas City II – 2021
Newton Sterling – Antigua Barracuda – 2011
Demar Stewart – Orlando City – 2011
Evan Taylor – Charleston Battery – 2011
Jermaine Taylor – Austin Bold – 2019–21
Ryan Thompson – Pittsburgh Riverhounds, Saint Louis FC – 2015–16
Jamoi Topey – Philadelphia Union II – 2019–20
Peter-Lee Vassell – Phoenix Rising, Indy Eleven, Hartford Athletic – 2019, 2021–
Jahmali Waite – Pittsburgh Riverhounds – 2022–
Amani Walker – Orange County Blues – 2015
Lamar Walker – Miami FC – 2021–
Chevaughn Walsh – Pittsburgh Riverhounds – 2016–17
Jason Watson – Wilmington Hammerheads – 2014
Je-Vaughn Watson – Charlotte Independence, Oklahoma City Energy, Austin Bold – 2018–20
Mitchily Waul – Charlotte Eagles – 2013
Blake White – Atlanta United 2 – 2018
Devon Williams – New York Red Bulls II, Louisville City, Miami FC – 2015–
Dino Williams – Charleston Battery – 2012
Duhaney Williams – LA Galaxy II – 2022–
Romario Williams – FC Montreal, Charleston Battery, Atlanta United 2, Miami FC – 2015–20
Chavany Willis – Bethlehem Steel – 2019
Paul Wilson – Harrisburg City Islanders – 2016–17
O'Brian Woodbine – Charleston Battery – 2015–19

Martinique
Jordy Delem – Seattle Sounders FC 2, San Antonio FC – 2016–19, 2022–

Mexico
Miguel Aguilar – Richmond Kickers, LA Galaxy II – 2015–18
Tony Alfaro – Seattle Sounders FC 2, Reno 1868 – 2016–18, 2020
Julián Araujo – LA Galaxy II – 2018
Xavier Báez – Austin Bold – 2019–21
Fidel Barajas – Charleston Battery – 2022–
Iván Becerra – Wilmington Hammerheads – 2011
Sal Bernal – Toronto FC II – 2015–16
Ricardo Bocanegra – Charlotte Independence – 2019
Éder Borelli – El Paso Locomotive – 2020–
Pato Botello Faz – Detroit City, Las Vegas Lights – 2022–
Omar Bravo – Phoenix Rising – 2017
José Carrera – Las Vegas Lights – 2020
Diego Casillas – Fresno FC, Reno 1868 – 2019–20
Javier Castro – Oklahoma City Energy – 2014
Oscar Dautt – Los Angeles Blues – 2011
Dan Delgado – Oklahoma City Energy – 2014–15
Jonathan de León – Los Angeles Blues – 2011
Isaác Díaz – Las Vegas Lights, Tulsa Roughnecks – 2018
Bruce El-mesmari – Las Vegas Lights – 2021–22
Jorge Escamilla – Fresno FC – 2019
Luis Espino – Sacramento Republic – 2017–18
Lalo Fernández – Phoenix FC, Real Monarchs – 2013, 2015–17
Ricardo Ferriño – Las Vegas Lights – 2018
Benjamín Galindo – Reno 1868 – 2019
Miguel Gallardo – Orlando City – 2011–14
Emilio García – Rio Grande Valley FC Toros – 2016–17
Juan Carlos García – Las Vegas Lights – 2018
Miguel Garduño – Las Vegas Lights, Loudoun United – 2018–19
Aarón Gómez – El Paso Locomotive – 2019–
Diego Gomez-Ochoa – Loudoun United – 2021
Adrián González – LA Galaxy II – 2020–
Fernando González – Colorado Springs Switchbacks – 2019
Gabriel Gonzalez – LA/Orange County Blues, Sacramento Republic – 2013–15
Miguel González – Colorado Springs Switchbacks, Oklahoma City Energy, Miami FC – 2015–18, 2020
Aarón Guillén – Tulsa Roughnecks, North Carolina FC, Tampa Bay Rowdies – 2017–
Diego Gutiérrez – Colorado Springs Switchbacks – 2017
Iván Gutiérrez – LA Galaxy II, Phoenix Rising, Orange County SC – 2019–22
Éver Guzmán – San Antonio FC, Hartford Athletic – 2017–20
Octavio Guzmán – Sacramento Republic, Saint Louis FC – 2014–17
Daniel Guzmán Jr. – Las Vegas Lights – 2018
Adolfo Hernández – Rio Grande Valley FC Toros – 2022–
Cristhian Hernández – Harrisburg City Islanders, Las Vegas Lights – 2013–14, 2019
José Hernández – Real Monarchs, LA Galaxy II, Oklahoma City Energy, Oakland Roots, Phoenix Rising – 2015, 2017–
Duilio Herrera – Rio Grande Valley FC Toros – 2022–
Joel Huiqui – Las Vegas Lights – 2018
Rodrigo Íñigo – Las Vegas Lights – 2018
Alonso Jiménez – Charlotte Eagles – 2013
Kichi – Los Angeles Blues – 2013
Edwin Lara – San Diego Loyal – 2020
Jesús Leal – Real Monarchs – 2016–17
Jonathan Levin – Tulsa Roughnecks, Las Vegas Lights, Phoenix Rising – 2017–22
Rubén Luna – Rio Grande Valley FC Toros – 2016–17
Uvaldo Luna – Colorado Springs Switchbacks – 2020
Manuel Madrid – Phoenix Rising – 2021–22
Ramón Martín del Campo – Ottawa Fury, Fresno FC, Las Vegas Lights, Oklahoma City Energy, Miami FC – 2017–21
Luis Martínez – Oklahoma City Energy – 2016–17
Raúl Mendiola – LA Galaxy II, Las Vegas Lights, Reno 1868, San Diego Loyal – 2014–20
Kevin Mendoza – Tampa Bay Rowdies – 2020
Carlos Merancio – Hartford Athletic – 2021
Víctor Milke – FC Tulsa – 2021
Leopoldo Morales – Los Angeles Blues – 2013
David Ochoa – Real Monarchs – 2018–20
Jaziel Orozco – Real Monarchs – 2021
Cristian Ortíz – Austin Bold – 2020
Edson Partida – El Paso Locomotive – 2019
Jonathan Perez – LA Galaxy II – 2020–
Ricardo Pérez – Colorado Springs Switchbacks, Charlotte Independence – 2017–18
Erik Pimentel – Rio Grande Valley FC Toros – 2021–
Julian Portugal – Tulsa Roughnecks, Las Vegas Lights – 2015, 2018
Aldo Quintanilla – Rio Grande Valley FC Toros, Austin Bold – 2018, 2020–21
José Ramos – Phoenix FC, Arizona United – 2013–14
Daniel Ríos – North Carolina FC, Nashville SC – 2018–19
Sergio Rivas – Reno 1868, New Mexico United – 2019–
Herbert Robinson García – Tacoma Defiance – 2019
Arturo Rodríguez – Real Monarchs, Phoenix Rising – 2020–
Carlos Rodriguez – Sacramento Republic – 2016–18
Abraham Romero – LA Galaxy II, Orange County SC, Las Vegas Lights – 2019–
Jesús Rubio – Tacoma Defiance, Colorado Springs Switchbacks – 2019–20
Miguel Salazar – San Antonio FC – 2016–17
Carlos Saldaña – Sacramento Republic – 2021–
Chuy Sanchez – Oklahoma City Energy – 2015
Christian Torres – Las Vegas Lights – 2018–19
Christian Torres – Las Vegas Lights – 2021–
Erick Torres – Orange County SC, Las Vegas Lights – 2022–
Danny Trejo – Las Vegas Lights – 2021–22
Iván Valencia – Reno 1868 – 2019
Julián Vázquez – Real Monarchs, Las Vegas Lights – 2019–21
Sergio Villaseñor – Charlotte Eagles – 2013
Salomón Wbias – Orange County SC – 2017

Nicaragua
Lester Meléndez – Puerto Rico United – 2011

Panama
Ricardo Ávila – Real Monarchs – 2019–20
Jiro Barriga Toyama – Monterey Bay FC – 2022
Guillermo Benítez – Atlanta United 2 – 2019
Christopher Cragwell – New York Red Bulls II – 2022–
Saed Díaz – Philadelphia Union II – 2019–20
Fidel Escobar – New York Red Bulls II – 2017–18
Carlos Harvey – LA Galaxy II – 2019–
Cristian Martínez – Pittsburgh Riverhounds, FC Cincinnati, Las Vegas Lights – 2016–17, 2019
Michael Amir Murillo – New York Red Bulls II – 2017
Francisco Narbón – FC Cincinnati, Seattle Sounders 2 – 2016–18
Luis Pereira – Toronto FC II – 2017
Romario Piggott – Charleston Battery – 2019–22
Carlos Small – Rio Grande Valley FC Toros – 2018–19
Tony Taylor – Ottawa Fury, San Antonio FC – 2018–19
Juan Tejada – Tampa Bay Rowdies, Indy Eleven – 2019–
Román Torres – Tacoma Defiance – 2019
Omar Valencia – New York Red Bulls II – 2022–
Ernesto Walker – LA Galaxy II – 2019

Puerto Rico
Isaac Angking – Charlotte Independence – 2019
Shawn Barry – Real Monarchs, Tampa Bay Rowdies – 2018–19
Andrés Cabrero – Puerto Rico United – 2011
Nicolás Cardona – Hartford Athletic – 2021
Alec Díaz – Tacoma Defiance – 2018–21
Raúl González – Richmond Kickers, Memphis 901 – 2017–18, 2020–
Jeremy Hall – Wilmington Hammerheads, Sacramento Republic – 2014, 2016–18
Jason Hernandez – Toronto FC II – 2017–18
Scott Jones – Charlotte Eagles – 2012
Cody Laurendi – LA Galaxy II, Austin Aztex, Oklahoma City Energy – 2014–20
Eloy Matos – River Plate Puerto Rico – 2011
Chris Megaloudis – River Plate Puerto Rico, FC New York – 2011
Joan Morales – Sevilla FC Puerto Rico – 2011
Isaac Nieves – Sevilla FC Puerto Rico – 2011
Antonio Pacheco – Sevilla FC Puerto Rico – 2011
Héctor Ramos – Puerto Rico United – 2011
Jorge Rivera – Penn FC – 2018
Wilfredo Rivera – Indy Eleven – 2022
Manolo Sánchez – New York Red Bulls II, San Antonio FC, Harrisburg City Islanders – 2015–17
Matthew Sánchez – Rio Grande Valley FC Toros – 2018
Jaden Servania – Birmingham Legion – 2020–21
Anthony Vázquez – Pittsburgh Riverhounds – 2013
Devin Vega – San Antonio FC, Phoenix Rising, Real Monarchs – 2017–20
Elliot Vélez – Sevilla FC Puerto Rico – 2011
Petter Villegas – River Plate Puerto Rico – 2011

Saint Kitts and Nevis
Irandy Byron – Antigua Barracuda – 2013
Tishan Hanley – Richmond Kickers – 2014
Atiba Harris – Oklahoma City Energy – 2018–20
Orlando Mitchum – Antigua Barracuda – 2011–13

Saint Lucia
Cowin Mathurin – Antigua Barracuda – 2011

Saint Vincent and the Grenadines
Oalex Anderson – Seattle Sounders FC 2 – 2015–16
Kyle Edwards – Rio Grande Valley FC Toros, Hartford Athletic – 2020–21, 2023–
Myron Samuel – Seattle Sounders FC 2 – 2015–16

Trinidad and Tobago
Aikim Andrews – Toronto FC II – 2017–18
Leland Archer – Charleston Battery – 2018–
Uriah Bentick – Wilmington Hammerheads, Richmond Kickers – 2013, 2015
Trevin Caesar – Austin Aztex, Orange County Blues, Sacramento Republic – 2015–17
Cordell Cato – Charlotte Independence, Oklahoma City Energy – 2018–20
Andrew De Gannes – Atlanta United 2 – 2022–
Justin Fojo – Orlando City – 2011
Ajani Fortune – Atlanta United 2 – 2020–
Andre Fortune II – Rochester Rhinos, North Carolina FC, Memphis 901 – 2016, 2018–21
Kevan George – Dayton Dutch Lions, Charlotte Independence – 2014, 2018–20
Shannon Gomez – Pittsburgh Riverhounds, Sacramento Republic, San Antonio FC – 2017–
Ataullah Guerra – Charleston Battery – 2016–19
Neveal Hackshaw – Charleston Battery, Indy Eleven – 2016–22
Triston Hodge – Toronto FC II, Memphis 901, Colorado Springs Switchbacks, Hartford Athletic – 2016, 2019–
Quame Holder – FC New York – 2011
Thorne Holder – FC New York – 2011
Justin Hoyte – FC Cincinnati – 2017–18
Jamal Jack – Pittsburgh Riverhounds, Colorado Springs Switchbacks – 2017–19
Kendall Jagdeosingh – Rochester Rhinos – 2011
Ricardo John – Toronto FC II – 2016–17
Alvin Jones – Oklahoma City Energy, Real Monarchs – 2019–20
Devorn Jorsling – Orlando City – 2011
Nathan Lewis – Indy Eleven – 2018
Yohance Marshall – Rochester Rhinos – 2011
Kierron Mason – Charleston Battery – 2019–20
Carlyle Mitchell – Indy Eleven – 2018
Kevin Molino – Orlando City – 2011–14
Duane Muckette – Memphis 901 – 2019–20
Leston Paul – Memphis 901 – 2019–
Jelani Peters – Toronto FC II, Pittsburgh Riverhounds, Memphis 901 – 2017–18, 2021–
Noah Powder – New York Red Bulls II, Orange County SC, Real Monarchs, Indy Eleven, FC Tulsa – 2016–22
Greg Ranjitsingh – Louisville City – 2015–18
Darryl Roberts – Charlotte Eagles – 2012
Kareem Smith – Colorado Springs Switchbacks – 2015
Ryan Telfer – Miami FC – 2023–
Darren Toby – Charlotte Eagles, VSI Tampa Bay – 2011–14
Bradley Welch – FC New York – 2011
Jesse Williams – Pittsburgh Riverhounds – 2022–
Mekeil Williams – Richmond Kickers, Oklahoma City Energy, Pittsburgh Riverhounds – 2018–19, 2021–
Rundell Winchester – Portland Timbers 2 – 2015

Turks and Caicos Islands
Billy Forbes – San Antonio FC, Phoenix Rising, Austin Bold, Miami FC, Detroit City – 2017–22

OFC

Fiji
Nicholas Prasad – Tulsa Roughnecks – 2019

New Zealand
Kyle Adams – Rio Grande Valley FC Toros, Real Monarchs, San Diego Loyal – 2018–
Hunter Ashworth – Pittsburgh Riverhounds, San Diego Loyal – 2020–21
Myer Bevan – Whitecaps FC 2, Fresno FC – 2017–18
Noah Billingsley – Las Vegas Lights, Phoenix Rising – 2020–21
Nikko Boxall – San Diego Loyal – 2022
Jackson Brady – Memphis 901 – 2022–
Sam Brotherton – North Carolina FC – 2019–20
Cory Brown – Fresno FC – 2018
Elliot Collier – Indy Eleven, Memphis 901, San Antonio FC, San Diego Loyal – 2018–19, 2022–
Kip Colvey – Sacramento Republic, Reno 1868, Colorado Springs Switchbacks – 2016–18
Moses Dyer – FC Tulsa – 2023–
Jake Gleeson – Sacramento Republic, Portland Timbers 2 – 2014–15
Max Mata – Real Monarchs – 2021
James Musa – Saint Louis FC, Swope Park Rangers, Phoenix Rising – 2015–19, 2021–
Monty Patterson – Oklahoma City Energy – 2018
Tim Payne – Portland Timbers 2 – 2015
Cole Peverley – Charleston Battery – 2011
Oscar Ramsay – Charlotte Independence – 2020
Shay Spitz – Los Angeles Blues, Richmond Kickers – 2012–14
Bill Tuiloma – Portland Timbers 2 – 2017—19
Deklan Wynne – Whitecaps FC 2, Oklahoma City Energy, Detroit City, Charleston Battery – 2015–17, 2021–

Notes

United States
Expatriate soccer players in Canada
Expatriate soccer players in the United States
Association football player non-biographical articles